

235001–235100 

|-bgcolor=#fefefe
| 235001 ||  || — || January 31, 2003 || Socorro || LINEAR || — || align=right | 1.2 km || 
|-id=002 bgcolor=#fefefe
| 235002 ||  || — || January 26, 2003 || Anderson Mesa || LONEOS || — || align=right | 1.1 km || 
|-id=003 bgcolor=#d6d6d6
| 235003 ||  || — || February 1, 2003 || Socorro || LINEAR || — || align=right | 6.5 km || 
|-id=004 bgcolor=#fefefe
| 235004 ||  || — || February 2, 2003 || Palomar || NEAT || — || align=right | 1.3 km || 
|-id=005 bgcolor=#fefefe
| 235005 ||  || — || February 7, 2003 || Palomar || NEAT || FLO || align=right | 1.2 km || 
|-id=006 bgcolor=#fefefe
| 235006 ||  || — || February 12, 2003 || Haleakala || NEAT || — || align=right | 1.0 km || 
|-id=007 bgcolor=#fefefe
| 235007 ||  || — || February 22, 2003 || Palomar || NEAT || V || align=right data-sort-value="0.93" | 930 m || 
|-id=008 bgcolor=#fefefe
| 235008 ||  || — || February 25, 2003 || Campo Imperatore || CINEOS || — || align=right data-sort-value="1" | 1000 m || 
|-id=009 bgcolor=#fefefe
| 235009 ||  || — || February 25, 2003 || Campo Imperatore || CINEOS || — || align=right | 1.7 km || 
|-id=010 bgcolor=#fefefe
| 235010 ||  || — || February 25, 2003 || Haleakala || NEAT || — || align=right | 1.3 km || 
|-id=011 bgcolor=#fefefe
| 235011 ||  || — || February 23, 2003 || Anderson Mesa || LONEOS || — || align=right | 1.3 km || 
|-id=012 bgcolor=#fefefe
| 235012 ||  || — || March 6, 2003 || Socorro || LINEAR || ERI || align=right | 2.5 km || 
|-id=013 bgcolor=#fefefe
| 235013 ||  || — || March 6, 2003 || Desert Eagle || W. K. Y. Yeung || FLO || align=right | 1.7 km || 
|-id=014 bgcolor=#fefefe
| 235014 ||  || — || March 4, 2003 || Saint-Véran || Saint-Véran Obs. || V || align=right | 1.0 km || 
|-id=015 bgcolor=#fefefe
| 235015 ||  || — || March 6, 2003 || Socorro || LINEAR || — || align=right | 1.5 km || 
|-id=016 bgcolor=#fefefe
| 235016 ||  || — || March 6, 2003 || Anderson Mesa || LONEOS || — || align=right | 1.7 km || 
|-id=017 bgcolor=#fefefe
| 235017 ||  || — || March 6, 2003 || Anderson Mesa || LONEOS || — || align=right data-sort-value="0.90" | 900 m || 
|-id=018 bgcolor=#fefefe
| 235018 ||  || — || March 6, 2003 || Socorro || LINEAR || — || align=right | 1.1 km || 
|-id=019 bgcolor=#fefefe
| 235019 ||  || — || March 6, 2003 || Socorro || LINEAR || — || align=right | 1.0 km || 
|-id=020 bgcolor=#fefefe
| 235020 ||  || — || March 6, 2003 || Palomar || NEAT || FLO || align=right data-sort-value="0.85" | 850 m || 
|-id=021 bgcolor=#fefefe
| 235021 ||  || — || March 7, 2003 || Anderson Mesa || LONEOS || NYS || align=right | 1.0 km || 
|-id=022 bgcolor=#fefefe
| 235022 ||  || — || March 7, 2003 || Socorro || LINEAR || — || align=right | 1.2 km || 
|-id=023 bgcolor=#fefefe
| 235023 ||  || — || March 10, 2003 || Anderson Mesa || LONEOS || — || align=right data-sort-value="0.86" | 860 m || 
|-id=024 bgcolor=#fefefe
| 235024 ||  || — || March 10, 2003 || Anderson Mesa || LONEOS || — || align=right | 1.3 km || 
|-id=025 bgcolor=#fefefe
| 235025 ||  || — || March 9, 2003 || Anderson Mesa || LONEOS || — || align=right | 1.9 km || 
|-id=026 bgcolor=#fefefe
| 235026 ||  || — || March 23, 2003 || Drebach || Drebach Obs. || FLO || align=right data-sort-value="0.86" | 860 m || 
|-id=027 bgcolor=#fefefe
| 235027 Pommard ||  ||  || March 23, 2003 || Vicques || M. Ory || — || align=right data-sort-value="0.94" | 940 m || 
|-id=028 bgcolor=#fefefe
| 235028 ||  || — || March 26, 2003 || Campo Imperatore || CINEOS || — || align=right | 1.2 km || 
|-id=029 bgcolor=#fefefe
| 235029 ||  || — || March 26, 2003 || Campo Imperatore || CINEOS || V || align=right data-sort-value="0.83" | 830 m || 
|-id=030 bgcolor=#fefefe
| 235030 ||  || — || March 26, 2003 || Kleť || M. Tichý, M. Kočer || V || align=right data-sort-value="0.91" | 910 m || 
|-id=031 bgcolor=#fefefe
| 235031 ||  || — || March 23, 2003 || Kitt Peak || Spacewatch || V || align=right | 1.0 km || 
|-id=032 bgcolor=#fefefe
| 235032 ||  || — || March 23, 2003 || Kitt Peak || Spacewatch || FLO || align=right data-sort-value="0.90" | 900 m || 
|-id=033 bgcolor=#fefefe
| 235033 ||  || — || March 23, 2003 || Kitt Peak || Spacewatch || — || align=right | 1.3 km || 
|-id=034 bgcolor=#fefefe
| 235034 ||  || — || March 24, 2003 || Kitt Peak || Spacewatch || — || align=right data-sort-value="0.96" | 960 m || 
|-id=035 bgcolor=#fefefe
| 235035 ||  || — || March 30, 2003 || Socorro || LINEAR || — || align=right | 1.2 km || 
|-id=036 bgcolor=#fefefe
| 235036 ||  || — || March 24, 2003 || Haleakala || NEAT || — || align=right | 1.3 km || 
|-id=037 bgcolor=#fefefe
| 235037 ||  || — || March 23, 2003 || Kitt Peak || Spacewatch || — || align=right | 1.8 km || 
|-id=038 bgcolor=#fefefe
| 235038 ||  || — || March 23, 2003 || Kitt Peak || Spacewatch || NYS || align=right data-sort-value="0.79" | 790 m || 
|-id=039 bgcolor=#fefefe
| 235039 ||  || — || March 25, 2003 || Palomar || NEAT || FLO || align=right | 1.6 km || 
|-id=040 bgcolor=#fefefe
| 235040 ||  || — || March 24, 2003 || Kitt Peak || Spacewatch || FLO || align=right | 1.2 km || 
|-id=041 bgcolor=#FA8072
| 235041 ||  || — || March 25, 2003 || Haleakala || NEAT || PHO || align=right | 1.6 km || 
|-id=042 bgcolor=#fefefe
| 235042 ||  || — || March 26, 2003 || Palomar || NEAT || — || align=right | 1.6 km || 
|-id=043 bgcolor=#fefefe
| 235043 ||  || — || March 26, 2003 || Palomar || NEAT || FLO || align=right data-sort-value="0.88" | 880 m || 
|-id=044 bgcolor=#fefefe
| 235044 ||  || — || March 26, 2003 || Palomar || NEAT || — || align=right | 1.6 km || 
|-id=045 bgcolor=#fefefe
| 235045 ||  || — || March 26, 2003 || Palomar || NEAT || FLO || align=right | 1.2 km || 
|-id=046 bgcolor=#fefefe
| 235046 ||  || — || March 26, 2003 || Palomar || NEAT || FLO || align=right | 1.0 km || 
|-id=047 bgcolor=#fefefe
| 235047 ||  || — || March 26, 2003 || Palomar || NEAT || NYS || align=right data-sort-value="0.86" | 860 m || 
|-id=048 bgcolor=#fefefe
| 235048 ||  || — || March 26, 2003 || Palomar || NEAT || — || align=right | 1.1 km || 
|-id=049 bgcolor=#fefefe
| 235049 ||  || — || March 26, 2003 || Palomar || NEAT || NYS || align=right | 2.7 km || 
|-id=050 bgcolor=#fefefe
| 235050 ||  || — || March 26, 2003 || Kitt Peak || Spacewatch || — || align=right data-sort-value="0.93" | 930 m || 
|-id=051 bgcolor=#fefefe
| 235051 ||  || — || March 26, 2003 || Kitt Peak || Spacewatch || NYS || align=right data-sort-value="0.99" | 990 m || 
|-id=052 bgcolor=#fefefe
| 235052 ||  || — || March 26, 2003 || Palomar || NEAT || V || align=right data-sort-value="0.93" | 930 m || 
|-id=053 bgcolor=#fefefe
| 235053 ||  || — || March 26, 2003 || Palomar || NEAT || — || align=right | 2.3 km || 
|-id=054 bgcolor=#fefefe
| 235054 ||  || — || March 26, 2003 || Palomar || NEAT || — || align=right | 1.4 km || 
|-id=055 bgcolor=#fefefe
| 235055 ||  || — || March 26, 2003 || Campo Imperatore || CINEOS || — || align=right data-sort-value="0.98" | 980 m || 
|-id=056 bgcolor=#fefefe
| 235056 ||  || — || March 27, 2003 || Palomar || NEAT || — || align=right | 1.5 km || 
|-id=057 bgcolor=#fefefe
| 235057 ||  || — || March 27, 2003 || Palomar || NEAT || FLO || align=right | 1.9 km || 
|-id=058 bgcolor=#fefefe
| 235058 ||  || — || March 30, 2003 || Socorro || LINEAR || — || align=right | 3.0 km || 
|-id=059 bgcolor=#fefefe
| 235059 ||  || — || March 30, 2003 || Socorro || LINEAR || MAS || align=right data-sort-value="0.99" | 990 m || 
|-id=060 bgcolor=#fefefe
| 235060 ||  || — || March 31, 2003 || Socorro || LINEAR || — || align=right | 1.3 km || 
|-id=061 bgcolor=#fefefe
| 235061 ||  || — || March 25, 2003 || Haleakala || NEAT || — || align=right | 1.3 km || 
|-id=062 bgcolor=#fefefe
| 235062 ||  || — || March 31, 2003 || Socorro || LINEAR || V || align=right | 1.1 km || 
|-id=063 bgcolor=#fefefe
| 235063 ||  || — || March 23, 2003 || Kitt Peak || Spacewatch || — || align=right | 1.3 km || 
|-id=064 bgcolor=#fefefe
| 235064 ||  || — || March 25, 2003 || Haleakala || NEAT || FLO || align=right data-sort-value="0.97" | 970 m || 
|-id=065 bgcolor=#fefefe
| 235065 ||  || — || March 26, 2003 || Anderson Mesa || LONEOS || — || align=right | 1.1 km || 
|-id=066 bgcolor=#fefefe
| 235066 ||  || — || March 29, 2003 || Anderson Mesa || LONEOS || ERI || align=right | 2.1 km || 
|-id=067 bgcolor=#fefefe
| 235067 ||  || — || March 27, 2003 || Palomar || NEAT || — || align=right | 2.4 km || 
|-id=068 bgcolor=#fefefe
| 235068 ||  || — || April 1, 2003 || Socorro || LINEAR || — || align=right | 1.1 km || 
|-id=069 bgcolor=#fefefe
| 235069 ||  || — || April 1, 2003 || Socorro || LINEAR || — || align=right data-sort-value="0.87" | 870 m || 
|-id=070 bgcolor=#fefefe
| 235070 ||  || — || April 4, 2003 || Kitt Peak || Spacewatch || NYS || align=right data-sort-value="0.84" | 840 m || 
|-id=071 bgcolor=#fefefe
| 235071 ||  || — || April 1, 2003 || Socorro || LINEAR || — || align=right | 1.3 km || 
|-id=072 bgcolor=#fefefe
| 235072 ||  || — || April 2, 2003 || Haleakala || NEAT || FLO || align=right data-sort-value="0.84" | 840 m || 
|-id=073 bgcolor=#fefefe
| 235073 ||  || — || April 5, 2003 || Kitt Peak || Spacewatch || — || align=right | 1.1 km || 
|-id=074 bgcolor=#fefefe
| 235074 ||  || — || April 8, 2003 || Haleakala || NEAT || — || align=right | 2.4 km || 
|-id=075 bgcolor=#fefefe
| 235075 ||  || — || April 5, 2003 || Haleakala || NEAT || V || align=right | 1.1 km || 
|-id=076 bgcolor=#fefefe
| 235076 ||  || — || April 8, 2003 || Socorro || LINEAR || NYS || align=right | 2.7 km || 
|-id=077 bgcolor=#fefefe
| 235077 ||  || — || April 4, 2003 || Kitt Peak || Spacewatch || — || align=right | 1.3 km || 
|-id=078 bgcolor=#fefefe
| 235078 ||  || — || April 7, 2003 || Kitt Peak || Spacewatch || — || align=right | 1.0 km || 
|-id=079 bgcolor=#fefefe
| 235079 ||  || — || April 8, 2003 || Haleakala || NEAT || — || align=right | 1.2 km || 
|-id=080 bgcolor=#fefefe
| 235080 ||  || — || April 1, 2003 || Kitt Peak || M. W. Buie || — || align=right | 1.6 km || 
|-id=081 bgcolor=#fefefe
| 235081 ||  || — || April 1, 2003 || Kitt Peak || M. W. Buie || — || align=right | 1.3 km || 
|-id=082 bgcolor=#fefefe
| 235082 ||  || — || April 9, 2003 || Kitt Peak || Spacewatch || — || align=right | 1.2 km || 
|-id=083 bgcolor=#fefefe
| 235083 ||  || — || April 24, 2003 || Anderson Mesa || LONEOS || FLO || align=right | 1.1 km || 
|-id=084 bgcolor=#fefefe
| 235084 ||  || — || April 24, 2003 || Kitt Peak || Spacewatch || — || align=right | 1.3 km || 
|-id=085 bgcolor=#fefefe
| 235085 ||  || — || April 23, 2003 || Campo Imperatore || CINEOS || — || align=right | 1.4 km || 
|-id=086 bgcolor=#FFC2E0
| 235086 ||  || — || April 25, 2003 || Anderson Mesa || LONEOS || AMO +1km || align=right | 1.0 km || 
|-id=087 bgcolor=#fefefe
| 235087 ||  || — || April 25, 2003 || Campo Imperatore || CINEOS || V || align=right data-sort-value="0.84" | 840 m || 
|-id=088 bgcolor=#E9E9E9
| 235088 ||  || — || April 27, 2003 || Anderson Mesa || LONEOS || — || align=right | 3.2 km || 
|-id=089 bgcolor=#fefefe
| 235089 ||  || — || April 28, 2003 || Kitt Peak || Spacewatch || — || align=right | 1.0 km || 
|-id=090 bgcolor=#E9E9E9
| 235090 ||  || — || April 29, 2003 || Socorro || LINEAR || — || align=right | 2.6 km || 
|-id=091 bgcolor=#fefefe
| 235091 ||  || — || April 28, 2003 || Kitt Peak || Spacewatch || NYS || align=right data-sort-value="0.91" | 910 m || 
|-id=092 bgcolor=#fefefe
| 235092 ||  || — || April 25, 2003 || Anderson Mesa || LONEOS || KLI || align=right | 2.4 km || 
|-id=093 bgcolor=#fefefe
| 235093 ||  || — || May 1, 2003 || Socorro || LINEAR || — || align=right | 1.4 km || 
|-id=094 bgcolor=#fefefe
| 235094 ||  || — || May 2, 2003 || Socorro || LINEAR || V || align=right data-sort-value="0.92" | 920 m || 
|-id=095 bgcolor=#fefefe
| 235095 ||  || — || May 2, 2003 || Socorro || LINEAR || — || align=right | 1.2 km || 
|-id=096 bgcolor=#fefefe
| 235096 ||  || — || May 2, 2003 || Socorro || LINEAR || V || align=right data-sort-value="0.99" | 990 m || 
|-id=097 bgcolor=#E9E9E9
| 235097 ||  || — || May 22, 2003 || Kitt Peak || Spacewatch || — || align=right | 1.6 km || 
|-id=098 bgcolor=#fefefe
| 235098 ||  || — || May 24, 2003 || Kitt Peak || Spacewatch || — || align=right | 1.4 km || 
|-id=099 bgcolor=#fefefe
| 235099 ||  || — || May 29, 2003 || Socorro || LINEAR || MAS || align=right | 1.1 km || 
|-id=100 bgcolor=#fefefe
| 235100 ||  || — || May 30, 2003 || Cerro Tololo || M. W. Buie || — || align=right | 1.1 km || 
|}

235101–235200 

|-bgcolor=#fefefe
| 235101 ||  || — || June 4, 2003 || Kitt Peak || Spacewatch || MAS || align=right data-sort-value="0.89" | 890 m || 
|-id=102 bgcolor=#fefefe
| 235102 ||  || — || June 1, 2003 || Kitt Peak || Spacewatch || — || align=right | 2.7 km || 
|-id=103 bgcolor=#fefefe
| 235103 ||  || — || June 23, 2003 || Socorro || LINEAR || PHO || align=right | 1.4 km || 
|-id=104 bgcolor=#E9E9E9
| 235104 ||  || — || June 28, 2003 || Socorro || LINEAR || — || align=right | 2.3 km || 
|-id=105 bgcolor=#fefefe
| 235105 ||  || — || July 4, 2003 || Reedy Creek || J. Broughton || — || align=right | 1.6 km || 
|-id=106 bgcolor=#E9E9E9
| 235106 ||  || — || July 22, 2003 || Haleakala || NEAT || — || align=right | 1.1 km || 
|-id=107 bgcolor=#fefefe
| 235107 ||  || — || July 21, 2003 || Palomar || NEAT || PHO || align=right | 1.5 km || 
|-id=108 bgcolor=#E9E9E9
| 235108 ||  || — || July 30, 2003 || Haleakala || NEAT || — || align=right | 4.0 km || 
|-id=109 bgcolor=#E9E9E9
| 235109 ||  || — || July 24, 2003 || Palomar || NEAT || — || align=right | 4.7 km || 
|-id=110 bgcolor=#E9E9E9
| 235110 ||  || — || July 24, 2003 || Palomar || NEAT || — || align=right | 1.4 km || 
|-id=111 bgcolor=#E9E9E9
| 235111 ||  || — || July 24, 2003 || Palomar || NEAT || EUN || align=right | 2.1 km || 
|-id=112 bgcolor=#E9E9E9
| 235112 ||  || — || July 24, 2003 || Palomar || NEAT || MAR || align=right | 1.7 km || 
|-id=113 bgcolor=#E9E9E9
| 235113 ||  || — || August 1, 2003 || Socorro || LINEAR || — || align=right | 2.6 km || 
|-id=114 bgcolor=#E9E9E9
| 235114 ||  || — || August 1, 2003 || Haleakala || NEAT || — || align=right | 3.5 km || 
|-id=115 bgcolor=#E9E9E9
| 235115 ||  || — || August 3, 2003 || Haleakala || NEAT || — || align=right | 3.5 km || 
|-id=116 bgcolor=#E9E9E9
| 235116 ||  || — || August 1, 2003 || Haleakala || NEAT || — || align=right | 2.3 km || 
|-id=117 bgcolor=#E9E9E9
| 235117 ||  || — || August 18, 2003 || Campo Imperatore || CINEOS || — || align=right | 2.3 km || 
|-id=118 bgcolor=#E9E9E9
| 235118 ||  || — || August 21, 2003 || Palomar || NEAT || DOR || align=right | 3.1 km || 
|-id=119 bgcolor=#E9E9E9
| 235119 ||  || — || August 20, 2003 || Campo Imperatore || CINEOS || GEF || align=right | 2.0 km || 
|-id=120 bgcolor=#E9E9E9
| 235120 ||  || — || August 22, 2003 || Haleakala || NEAT || — || align=right | 3.5 km || 
|-id=121 bgcolor=#E9E9E9
| 235121 ||  || — || August 22, 2003 || Palomar || NEAT || — || align=right | 3.9 km || 
|-id=122 bgcolor=#E9E9E9
| 235122 ||  || — || August 22, 2003 || Haleakala || NEAT || — || align=right | 2.6 km || 
|-id=123 bgcolor=#d6d6d6
| 235123 ||  || — || August 22, 2003 || Haleakala || NEAT || — || align=right | 3.2 km || 
|-id=124 bgcolor=#fefefe
| 235124 ||  || — || August 22, 2003 || Palomar || NEAT || — || align=right | 1.3 km || 
|-id=125 bgcolor=#E9E9E9
| 235125 ||  || — || August 22, 2003 || Palomar || NEAT || — || align=right | 1.6 km || 
|-id=126 bgcolor=#E9E9E9
| 235126 ||  || — || August 22, 2003 || Socorro || LINEAR || MAR || align=right | 1.8 km || 
|-id=127 bgcolor=#E9E9E9
| 235127 ||  || — || August 22, 2003 || Palomar || NEAT || — || align=right | 3.5 km || 
|-id=128 bgcolor=#E9E9E9
| 235128 ||  || — || August 23, 2003 || Palomar || NEAT || — || align=right | 1.6 km || 
|-id=129 bgcolor=#fefefe
| 235129 ||  || — || August 23, 2003 || Socorro || LINEAR || H || align=right data-sort-value="0.87" | 870 m || 
|-id=130 bgcolor=#E9E9E9
| 235130 ||  || — || August 23, 2003 || Socorro || LINEAR || — || align=right | 1.4 km || 
|-id=131 bgcolor=#E9E9E9
| 235131 ||  || — || August 23, 2003 || Socorro || LINEAR || — || align=right | 3.6 km || 
|-id=132 bgcolor=#E9E9E9
| 235132 ||  || — || August 23, 2003 || Palomar || NEAT || — || align=right | 2.4 km || 
|-id=133 bgcolor=#E9E9E9
| 235133 ||  || — || August 23, 2003 || Socorro || LINEAR || MAR || align=right | 1.7 km || 
|-id=134 bgcolor=#E9E9E9
| 235134 ||  || — || August 23, 2003 || Socorro || LINEAR || — || align=right | 2.3 km || 
|-id=135 bgcolor=#E9E9E9
| 235135 ||  || — || August 23, 2003 || Socorro || LINEAR || EUN || align=right | 2.1 km || 
|-id=136 bgcolor=#E9E9E9
| 235136 ||  || — || August 23, 2003 || Socorro || LINEAR || TIN || align=right | 1.8 km || 
|-id=137 bgcolor=#E9E9E9
| 235137 ||  || — || August 23, 2003 || Socorro || LINEAR || — || align=right | 1.7 km || 
|-id=138 bgcolor=#E9E9E9
| 235138 ||  || — || August 25, 2003 || Socorro || LINEAR || JUN || align=right | 1.7 km || 
|-id=139 bgcolor=#E9E9E9
| 235139 ||  || — || August 26, 2003 || Reedy Creek || J. Broughton || — || align=right | 4.3 km || 
|-id=140 bgcolor=#E9E9E9
| 235140 ||  || — || August 23, 2003 || Palomar || NEAT || — || align=right | 4.3 km || 
|-id=141 bgcolor=#fefefe
| 235141 ||  || — || August 24, 2003 || Socorro || LINEAR || ERI || align=right | 2.6 km || 
|-id=142 bgcolor=#E9E9E9
| 235142 ||  || — || August 24, 2003 || Socorro || LINEAR || PAL || align=right | 4.3 km || 
|-id=143 bgcolor=#d6d6d6
| 235143 ||  || — || August 24, 2003 || Socorro || LINEAR || EUP || align=right | 5.6 km || 
|-id=144 bgcolor=#E9E9E9
| 235144 ||  || — || August 23, 2003 || Socorro || LINEAR || — || align=right | 2.3 km || 
|-id=145 bgcolor=#E9E9E9
| 235145 ||  || — || August 25, 2003 || Cerro Tololo || M. W. Buie || — || align=right | 1.2 km || 
|-id=146 bgcolor=#E9E9E9
| 235146 ||  || — || August 30, 2003 || Haleakala || NEAT || EUNfast? || align=right | 1.7 km || 
|-id=147 bgcolor=#E9E9E9
| 235147 ||  || — || August 29, 2003 || Haleakala || NEAT || EUN || align=right | 2.0 km || 
|-id=148 bgcolor=#E9E9E9
| 235148 ||  || — || August 31, 2003 || Kitt Peak || Spacewatch || — || align=right | 1.2 km || 
|-id=149 bgcolor=#E9E9E9
| 235149 ||  || — || August 29, 2003 || Socorro || LINEAR || — || align=right | 2.5 km || 
|-id=150 bgcolor=#E9E9E9
| 235150 ||  || — || August 31, 2003 || Haleakala || NEAT || GAL || align=right | 2.5 km || 
|-id=151 bgcolor=#fefefe
| 235151 ||  || — || September 2, 2003 || Socorro || LINEAR || H || align=right | 1.2 km || 
|-id=152 bgcolor=#d6d6d6
| 235152 ||  || — || September 2, 2003 || Socorro || LINEAR || — || align=right | 4.3 km || 
|-id=153 bgcolor=#E9E9E9
| 235153 ||  || — || September 2, 2003 || Reedy Creek || J. Broughton || ADE || align=right | 3.8 km || 
|-id=154 bgcolor=#E9E9E9
| 235154 ||  || — || September 4, 2003 || Kitt Peak || Spacewatch || — || align=right | 3.7 km || 
|-id=155 bgcolor=#E9E9E9
| 235155 ||  || — || September 1, 2003 || Socorro || LINEAR || — || align=right | 1.6 km || 
|-id=156 bgcolor=#d6d6d6
| 235156 ||  || — || September 4, 2003 || Socorro || LINEAR || — || align=right | 5.5 km || 
|-id=157 bgcolor=#E9E9E9
| 235157 ||  || — || September 13, 2003 || Haleakala || NEAT || — || align=right | 2.5 km || 
|-id=158 bgcolor=#E9E9E9
| 235158 ||  || — || September 16, 2003 || Kitt Peak || Spacewatch || — || align=right | 2.8 km || 
|-id=159 bgcolor=#E9E9E9
| 235159 ||  || — || September 16, 2003 || Palomar || NEAT || — || align=right | 2.7 km || 
|-id=160 bgcolor=#E9E9E9
| 235160 ||  || — || September 16, 2003 || Palomar || NEAT || EUN || align=right | 1.4 km || 
|-id=161 bgcolor=#d6d6d6
| 235161 ||  || — || September 16, 2003 || Kitt Peak || Spacewatch || — || align=right | 4.4 km || 
|-id=162 bgcolor=#d6d6d6
| 235162 ||  || — || September 16, 2003 || Palomar || NEAT || — || align=right | 4.3 km || 
|-id=163 bgcolor=#E9E9E9
| 235163 ||  || — || September 16, 2003 || Kitt Peak || Spacewatch || — || align=right | 1.7 km || 
|-id=164 bgcolor=#fefefe
| 235164 ||  || — || September 17, 2003 || Socorro || LINEAR || H || align=right | 1.2 km || 
|-id=165 bgcolor=#E9E9E9
| 235165 ||  || — || September 17, 2003 || Socorro || LINEAR || — || align=right | 4.1 km || 
|-id=166 bgcolor=#E9E9E9
| 235166 ||  || — || September 18, 2003 || Kitt Peak || Spacewatch || NEM || align=right | 3.1 km || 
|-id=167 bgcolor=#E9E9E9
| 235167 ||  || — || September 18, 2003 || Socorro || LINEAR || — || align=right | 3.9 km || 
|-id=168 bgcolor=#E9E9E9
| 235168 ||  || — || September 16, 2003 || Anderson Mesa || LONEOS || EUN || align=right | 1.6 km || 
|-id=169 bgcolor=#d6d6d6
| 235169 ||  || — || September 16, 2003 || Anderson Mesa || LONEOS || — || align=right | 4.1 km || 
|-id=170 bgcolor=#E9E9E9
| 235170 ||  || — || September 16, 2003 || Anderson Mesa || LONEOS || MRX || align=right | 1.7 km || 
|-id=171 bgcolor=#E9E9E9
| 235171 ||  || — || September 16, 2003 || Anderson Mesa || LONEOS || — || align=right | 4.8 km || 
|-id=172 bgcolor=#E9E9E9
| 235172 ||  || — || September 18, 2003 || Palomar || NEAT || GEF || align=right | 2.1 km || 
|-id=173 bgcolor=#E9E9E9
| 235173 ||  || — || September 17, 2003 || Kitt Peak || Spacewatch || — || align=right | 3.1 km || 
|-id=174 bgcolor=#E9E9E9
| 235174 ||  || — || September 17, 2003 || Socorro || LINEAR || MRX || align=right | 1.5 km || 
|-id=175 bgcolor=#E9E9E9
| 235175 ||  || — || September 17, 2003 || Socorro || LINEAR || MAR || align=right | 1.7 km || 
|-id=176 bgcolor=#E9E9E9
| 235176 ||  || — || September 18, 2003 || Campo Imperatore || CINEOS || — || align=right | 1.1 km || 
|-id=177 bgcolor=#E9E9E9
| 235177 ||  || — || September 18, 2003 || Socorro || LINEAR || — || align=right | 3.6 km || 
|-id=178 bgcolor=#E9E9E9
| 235178 ||  || — || September 18, 2003 || Campo Imperatore || CINEOS || — || align=right | 4.1 km || 
|-id=179 bgcolor=#d6d6d6
| 235179 ||  || — || September 17, 2003 || Kitt Peak || Spacewatch || — || align=right | 3.8 km || 
|-id=180 bgcolor=#E9E9E9
| 235180 ||  || — || September 18, 2003 || Kitt Peak || Spacewatch || — || align=right | 1.6 km || 
|-id=181 bgcolor=#E9E9E9
| 235181 ||  || — || September 19, 2003 || Kitt Peak || Spacewatch || — || align=right | 2.6 km || 
|-id=182 bgcolor=#E9E9E9
| 235182 ||  || — || September 18, 2003 || Kitt Peak || Spacewatch || GEF || align=right | 1.6 km || 
|-id=183 bgcolor=#E9E9E9
| 235183 ||  || — || September 18, 2003 || Kitt Peak || Spacewatch || — || align=right | 1.7 km || 
|-id=184 bgcolor=#E9E9E9
| 235184 ||  || — || September 18, 2003 || Kitt Peak || Spacewatch || — || align=right | 4.1 km || 
|-id=185 bgcolor=#E9E9E9
| 235185 ||  || — || September 18, 2003 || Palomar || NEAT || WIT || align=right | 1.5 km || 
|-id=186 bgcolor=#E9E9E9
| 235186 ||  || — || September 19, 2003 || Haleakala || NEAT || — || align=right | 4.4 km || 
|-id=187 bgcolor=#E9E9E9
| 235187 ||  || — || September 20, 2003 || Kitt Peak || Spacewatch || — || align=right | 2.0 km || 
|-id=188 bgcolor=#E9E9E9
| 235188 ||  || — || September 20, 2003 || Palomar || NEAT || — || align=right | 1.7 km || 
|-id=189 bgcolor=#E9E9E9
| 235189 ||  || — || September 20, 2003 || Palomar || NEAT || — || align=right | 2.0 km || 
|-id=190 bgcolor=#d6d6d6
| 235190 ||  || — || September 20, 2003 || Palomar || NEAT || — || align=right | 5.5 km || 
|-id=191 bgcolor=#E9E9E9
| 235191 ||  || — || September 20, 2003 || Črni Vrh || Črni Vrh || — || align=right | 2.5 km || 
|-id=192 bgcolor=#E9E9E9
| 235192 ||  || — || September 20, 2003 || Essen || Walter Hohmann Obs. || — || align=right | 2.7 km || 
|-id=193 bgcolor=#E9E9E9
| 235193 ||  || — || September 18, 2003 || Palomar || NEAT || — || align=right | 1.8 km || 
|-id=194 bgcolor=#E9E9E9
| 235194 ||  || — || September 18, 2003 || Kitt Peak || Spacewatch || AGN || align=right | 1.8 km || 
|-id=195 bgcolor=#E9E9E9
| 235195 ||  || — || September 21, 2003 || Črni Vrh || J. Skvarč || HNS || align=right | 1.9 km || 
|-id=196 bgcolor=#E9E9E9
| 235196 ||  || — || September 20, 2003 || Palomar || NEAT || ADE || align=right | 3.6 km || 
|-id=197 bgcolor=#E9E9E9
| 235197 ||  || — || September 20, 2003 || Haleakala || NEAT || — || align=right | 4.1 km || 
|-id=198 bgcolor=#E9E9E9
| 235198 ||  || — || September 16, 2003 || Socorro || LINEAR || INO || align=right | 2.0 km || 
|-id=199 bgcolor=#E9E9E9
| 235199 ||  || — || September 16, 2003 || Kitt Peak || Spacewatch || — || align=right | 2.1 km || 
|-id=200 bgcolor=#E9E9E9
| 235200 ||  || — || September 19, 2003 || Anderson Mesa || LONEOS || — || align=right | 3.7 km || 
|}

235201–235300 

|-bgcolor=#d6d6d6
| 235201 Lorántffy ||  ||  || September 23, 2003 || Piszkéstető || K. Sárneczky, B. Sipőcz || Tj (2.97) || align=right | 4.6 km || 
|-id=202 bgcolor=#E9E9E9
| 235202 ||  || — || September 23, 2003 || Haleakala || NEAT || GER || align=right | 1.7 km || 
|-id=203 bgcolor=#E9E9E9
| 235203 ||  || — || September 20, 2003 || Anderson Mesa || LONEOS || HOF || align=right | 3.8 km || 
|-id=204 bgcolor=#E9E9E9
| 235204 ||  || — || September 22, 2003 || Socorro || LINEAR || — || align=right | 3.8 km || 
|-id=205 bgcolor=#E9E9E9
| 235205 ||  || — || September 22, 2003 || Kitt Peak || Spacewatch || WIT || align=right | 1.9 km || 
|-id=206 bgcolor=#E9E9E9
| 235206 ||  || — || September 18, 2003 || Kitt Peak || Spacewatch || AGN || align=right | 1.5 km || 
|-id=207 bgcolor=#E9E9E9
| 235207 ||  || — || September 18, 2003 || Kitt Peak || Spacewatch || PAD || align=right | 2.2 km || 
|-id=208 bgcolor=#d6d6d6
| 235208 ||  || — || September 21, 2003 || Socorro || LINEAR || — || align=right | 3.6 km || 
|-id=209 bgcolor=#E9E9E9
| 235209 ||  || — || September 22, 2003 || Anderson Mesa || LONEOS || — || align=right | 1.2 km || 
|-id=210 bgcolor=#E9E9E9
| 235210 ||  || — || September 22, 2003 || Anderson Mesa || LONEOS || — || align=right | 2.5 km || 
|-id=211 bgcolor=#E9E9E9
| 235211 ||  || — || September 22, 2003 || Kitt Peak || Spacewatch || — || align=right | 3.7 km || 
|-id=212 bgcolor=#d6d6d6
| 235212 ||  || — || September 20, 2003 || Palomar || NEAT || — || align=right | 3.9 km || 
|-id=213 bgcolor=#E9E9E9
| 235213 ||  || — || September 26, 2003 || Desert Eagle || W. K. Y. Yeung || GEF || align=right | 2.2 km || 
|-id=214 bgcolor=#E9E9E9
| 235214 ||  || — || September 23, 2003 || Haleakala || NEAT || — || align=right | 4.0 km || 
|-id=215 bgcolor=#E9E9E9
| 235215 ||  || — || September 27, 2003 || Kitt Peak || Spacewatch || — || align=right | 2.9 km || 
|-id=216 bgcolor=#E9E9E9
| 235216 ||  || — || September 27, 2003 || Sierra Nevada || Sierra Nevada Obs. || — || align=right | 2.0 km || 
|-id=217 bgcolor=#E9E9E9
| 235217 ||  || — || September 30, 2003 || Drebach || T. Payer || — || align=right | 3.6 km || 
|-id=218 bgcolor=#E9E9E9
| 235218 ||  || — || September 24, 2003 || Palomar || NEAT || — || align=right | 3.1 km || 
|-id=219 bgcolor=#E9E9E9
| 235219 ||  || — || September 24, 2003 || Palomar || NEAT || NEM || align=right | 3.6 km || 
|-id=220 bgcolor=#E9E9E9
| 235220 ||  || — || September 24, 2003 || Haleakala || NEAT || GEF || align=right | 1.5 km || 
|-id=221 bgcolor=#E9E9E9
| 235221 ||  || — || September 26, 2003 || Socorro || LINEAR || — || align=right | 2.8 km || 
|-id=222 bgcolor=#E9E9E9
| 235222 ||  || — || September 26, 2003 || Socorro || LINEAR || — || align=right | 2.6 km || 
|-id=223 bgcolor=#E9E9E9
| 235223 ||  || — || September 26, 2003 || Desert Eagle || W. K. Y. Yeung || HEN || align=right | 1.2 km || 
|-id=224 bgcolor=#E9E9E9
| 235224 ||  || — || September 27, 2003 || Socorro || LINEAR || HOF || align=right | 4.7 km || 
|-id=225 bgcolor=#E9E9E9
| 235225 ||  || — || September 26, 2003 || Socorro || LINEAR || — || align=right | 2.7 km || 
|-id=226 bgcolor=#E9E9E9
| 235226 ||  || — || September 26, 2003 || Socorro || LINEAR || — || align=right | 2.7 km || 
|-id=227 bgcolor=#E9E9E9
| 235227 ||  || — || September 26, 2003 || Socorro || LINEAR || — || align=right | 1.4 km || 
|-id=228 bgcolor=#fefefe
| 235228 ||  || — || September 26, 2003 || Socorro || LINEAR || H || align=right data-sort-value="0.94" | 940 m || 
|-id=229 bgcolor=#E9E9E9
| 235229 ||  || — || September 27, 2003 || Anderson Mesa || LONEOS || — || align=right | 2.5 km || 
|-id=230 bgcolor=#E9E9E9
| 235230 ||  || — || September 27, 2003 || Kitt Peak || Spacewatch || — || align=right | 2.0 km || 
|-id=231 bgcolor=#E9E9E9
| 235231 ||  || — || September 28, 2003 || Kitt Peak || Spacewatch || — || align=right | 2.9 km || 
|-id=232 bgcolor=#d6d6d6
| 235232 ||  || — || September 28, 2003 || Kitt Peak || Spacewatch || — || align=right | 3.7 km || 
|-id=233 bgcolor=#d6d6d6
| 235233 ||  || — || September 28, 2003 || Kitt Peak || Spacewatch || — || align=right | 3.9 km || 
|-id=234 bgcolor=#E9E9E9
| 235234 ||  || — || September 27, 2003 || Socorro || LINEAR || — || align=right | 2.8 km || 
|-id=235 bgcolor=#E9E9E9
| 235235 ||  || — || September 28, 2003 || Socorro || LINEAR || — || align=right | 3.6 km || 
|-id=236 bgcolor=#E9E9E9
| 235236 ||  || — || September 29, 2003 || Kitt Peak || Spacewatch || HEN || align=right | 1.2 km || 
|-id=237 bgcolor=#E9E9E9
| 235237 ||  || — || September 29, 2003 || Kitt Peak || Spacewatch || — || align=right | 1.8 km || 
|-id=238 bgcolor=#E9E9E9
| 235238 ||  || — || September 18, 2003 || Socorro || LINEAR || — || align=right | 3.3 km || 
|-id=239 bgcolor=#E9E9E9
| 235239 ||  || — || September 28, 2003 || Kitt Peak || Spacewatch || WIT || align=right | 1.4 km || 
|-id=240 bgcolor=#d6d6d6
| 235240 ||  || — || September 28, 2003 || Kitt Peak || Spacewatch || KOR || align=right | 1.7 km || 
|-id=241 bgcolor=#E9E9E9
| 235241 ||  || — || September 17, 2003 || Palomar || NEAT || WIT || align=right | 1.3 km || 
|-id=242 bgcolor=#E9E9E9
| 235242 ||  || — || September 17, 2003 || Palomar || NEAT || — || align=right | 3.7 km || 
|-id=243 bgcolor=#E9E9E9
| 235243 ||  || — || September 17, 2003 || Palomar || NEAT || AGN || align=right | 1.6 km || 
|-id=244 bgcolor=#d6d6d6
| 235244 ||  || — || September 29, 2003 || Socorro || LINEAR || — || align=right | 3.9 km || 
|-id=245 bgcolor=#E9E9E9
| 235245 ||  || — || September 29, 2003 || Socorro || LINEAR || EUN || align=right | 1.7 km || 
|-id=246 bgcolor=#E9E9E9
| 235246 ||  || — || September 16, 2003 || Kitt Peak || Spacewatch || — || align=right | 3.1 km || 
|-id=247 bgcolor=#E9E9E9
| 235247 ||  || — || September 21, 2003 || Anderson Mesa || LONEOS || — || align=right | 2.0 km || 
|-id=248 bgcolor=#E9E9E9
| 235248 ||  || — || September 28, 2003 || Anderson Mesa || LONEOS || — || align=right | 1.3 km || 
|-id=249 bgcolor=#E9E9E9
| 235249 ||  || — || September 17, 2003 || Socorro || LINEAR || — || align=right | 2.2 km || 
|-id=250 bgcolor=#d6d6d6
| 235250 ||  || — || September 18, 2003 || Kitt Peak || Spacewatch || — || align=right | 3.3 km || 
|-id=251 bgcolor=#d6d6d6
| 235251 ||  || — || September 18, 2003 || Kitt Peak || Spacewatch || — || align=right | 2.7 km || 
|-id=252 bgcolor=#E9E9E9
| 235252 ||  || — || September 21, 2003 || Anderson Mesa || LONEOS || GEF || align=right | 1.6 km || 
|-id=253 bgcolor=#d6d6d6
| 235253 ||  || — || September 22, 2003 || Palomar || NEAT || — || align=right | 3.4 km || 
|-id=254 bgcolor=#E9E9E9
| 235254 ||  || — || September 28, 2003 || Socorro || LINEAR || — || align=right | 3.8 km || 
|-id=255 bgcolor=#E9E9E9
| 235255 ||  || — || September 16, 2003 || Kitt Peak || Spacewatch || — || align=right | 3.2 km || 
|-id=256 bgcolor=#E9E9E9
| 235256 ||  || — || September 21, 2003 || Palomar || NEAT || — || align=right | 3.2 km || 
|-id=257 bgcolor=#E9E9E9
| 235257 ||  || — || September 22, 2003 || Anderson Mesa || LONEOS || — || align=right | 2.6 km || 
|-id=258 bgcolor=#E9E9E9
| 235258 ||  || — || September 26, 2003 || Apache Point || SDSS || — || align=right | 2.0 km || 
|-id=259 bgcolor=#E9E9E9
| 235259 ||  || — || September 28, 2003 || Apache Point || SDSS || HOF || align=right | 2.6 km || 
|-id=260 bgcolor=#E9E9E9
| 235260 ||  || — || September 28, 2003 || Apache Point || SDSS || — || align=right | 1.9 km || 
|-id=261 bgcolor=#E9E9E9
| 235261 ||  || — || September 29, 2003 || Apache Point || SDSS || — || align=right | 2.7 km || 
|-id=262 bgcolor=#E9E9E9
| 235262 ||  || — || September 16, 2003 || Kitt Peak || Spacewatch || — || align=right | 2.0 km || 
|-id=263 bgcolor=#E9E9E9
| 235263 ||  || — || September 18, 2003 || Kitt Peak || Spacewatch || — || align=right | 3.4 km || 
|-id=264 bgcolor=#E9E9E9
| 235264 ||  || — || October 2, 2003 || Kitt Peak || Spacewatch || — || align=right | 2.6 km || 
|-id=265 bgcolor=#E9E9E9
| 235265 ||  || — || October 3, 2003 || Haleakala || NEAT || — || align=right | 4.6 km || 
|-id=266 bgcolor=#E9E9E9
| 235266 ||  || — || October 4, 2003 || Kitt Peak || Spacewatch || MIT || align=right | 4.4 km || 
|-id=267 bgcolor=#d6d6d6
| 235267 ||  || — || October 14, 2003 || Anderson Mesa || LONEOS || — || align=right | 5.1 km || 
|-id=268 bgcolor=#E9E9E9
| 235268 ||  || — || October 14, 2003 || Anderson Mesa || LONEOS || — || align=right | 3.0 km || 
|-id=269 bgcolor=#d6d6d6
| 235269 ||  || — || October 15, 2003 || Anderson Mesa || LONEOS || — || align=right | 5.3 km || 
|-id=270 bgcolor=#E9E9E9
| 235270 ||  || — || October 1, 2003 || Kitt Peak || Spacewatch || HNA || align=right | 2.6 km || 
|-id=271 bgcolor=#E9E9E9
| 235271 ||  || — || October 2, 2003 || Kitt Peak || Spacewatch || GEF || align=right | 3.8 km || 
|-id=272 bgcolor=#d6d6d6
| 235272 ||  || — || October 2, 2003 || Haleakala || NEAT || — || align=right | 4.7 km || 
|-id=273 bgcolor=#fefefe
| 235273 ||  || — || October 3, 2003 || Kitt Peak || Spacewatch || H || align=right data-sort-value="0.65" | 650 m || 
|-id=274 bgcolor=#d6d6d6
| 235274 ||  || — || October 3, 2003 || Haleakala || NEAT || — || align=right | 2.9 km || 
|-id=275 bgcolor=#E9E9E9
| 235275 ||  || — || October 6, 2003 || Anderson Mesa || LONEOS || HEN || align=right | 1.3 km || 
|-id=276 bgcolor=#d6d6d6
| 235276 ||  || — || October 2, 2003 || Kitt Peak || Spacewatch || — || align=right | 2.8 km || 
|-id=277 bgcolor=#E9E9E9
| 235277 ||  || — || October 16, 2003 || Anderson Mesa || LONEOS || MAR || align=right | 1.8 km || 
|-id=278 bgcolor=#fefefe
| 235278 ||  || — || October 16, 2003 || Anderson Mesa || LONEOS || H || align=right data-sort-value="0.76" | 760 m || 
|-id=279 bgcolor=#d6d6d6
| 235279 ||  || — || October 17, 2003 || Anderson Mesa || LONEOS || — || align=right | 4.5 km || 
|-id=280 bgcolor=#E9E9E9
| 235280 ||  || — || October 18, 2003 || Kitt Peak || Spacewatch || NEM || align=right | 3.5 km || 
|-id=281 bgcolor=#d6d6d6
| 235281 Jackwilliamson ||  ||  || October 18, 2003 || Saint-Sulpice || B. Christophe || EUP || align=right | 5.4 km || 
|-id=282 bgcolor=#E9E9E9
| 235282 ||  || — || October 20, 2003 || Kingsnake || J. V. McClusky || — || align=right | 2.8 km || 
|-id=283 bgcolor=#d6d6d6
| 235283 ||  || — || October 22, 2003 || Kvistaberg || UDAS || MEL || align=right | 5.3 km || 
|-id=284 bgcolor=#E9E9E9
| 235284 ||  || — || October 16, 2003 || Kitt Peak || Spacewatch || — || align=right | 1.8 km || 
|-id=285 bgcolor=#E9E9E9
| 235285 ||  || — || October 17, 2003 || Kitt Peak || Spacewatch || — || align=right | 2.4 km || 
|-id=286 bgcolor=#d6d6d6
| 235286 ||  || — || October 16, 2003 || Palomar || NEAT || LIX || align=right | 5.2 km || 
|-id=287 bgcolor=#E9E9E9
| 235287 ||  || — || October 17, 2003 || Kitt Peak || Spacewatch || AGN || align=right | 1.3 km || 
|-id=288 bgcolor=#E9E9E9
| 235288 ||  || — || October 17, 2003 || Kitt Peak || Spacewatch || WIT || align=right | 1.4 km || 
|-id=289 bgcolor=#E9E9E9
| 235289 ||  || — || October 16, 2003 || Palomar || NEAT || MIT || align=right | 3.7 km || 
|-id=290 bgcolor=#E9E9E9
| 235290 ||  || — || October 18, 2003 || Palomar || NEAT || — || align=right | 3.4 km || 
|-id=291 bgcolor=#d6d6d6
| 235291 ||  || — || October 23, 2003 || Kitt Peak || Spacewatch || EUP || align=right | 7.1 km || 
|-id=292 bgcolor=#E9E9E9
| 235292 ||  || — || October 16, 2003 || Kitt Peak || Spacewatch || — || align=right | 3.1 km || 
|-id=293 bgcolor=#d6d6d6
| 235293 ||  || — || October 16, 2003 || Palomar || NEAT || — || align=right | 5.0 km || 
|-id=294 bgcolor=#E9E9E9
| 235294 ||  || — || October 18, 2003 || Kitt Peak || Spacewatch || HOF || align=right | 2.8 km || 
|-id=295 bgcolor=#E9E9E9
| 235295 ||  || — || October 19, 2003 || Kitt Peak || Spacewatch || — || align=right | 3.1 km || 
|-id=296 bgcolor=#fefefe
| 235296 ||  || — || October 28, 2003 || Socorro || LINEAR || H || align=right data-sort-value="0.77" | 770 m || 
|-id=297 bgcolor=#E9E9E9
| 235297 ||  || — || October 16, 2003 || Kitt Peak || Spacewatch || — || align=right | 3.2 km || 
|-id=298 bgcolor=#E9E9E9
| 235298 ||  || — || October 16, 2003 || Kitt Peak || Spacewatch || — || align=right | 1.7 km || 
|-id=299 bgcolor=#E9E9E9
| 235299 ||  || — || October 17, 2003 || Anderson Mesa || LONEOS || — || align=right | 4.8 km || 
|-id=300 bgcolor=#E9E9E9
| 235300 ||  || — || October 18, 2003 || Palomar || NEAT || — || align=right | 2.8 km || 
|}

235301–235400 

|-bgcolor=#d6d6d6
| 235301 ||  || — || October 20, 2003 || Kitt Peak || Spacewatch || KOR || align=right | 1.7 km || 
|-id=302 bgcolor=#E9E9E9
| 235302 ||  || — || October 17, 2003 || Anderson Mesa || LONEOS || — || align=right | 4.6 km || 
|-id=303 bgcolor=#E9E9E9
| 235303 ||  || — || October 18, 2003 || Kitt Peak || Spacewatch || — || align=right | 2.1 km || 
|-id=304 bgcolor=#E9E9E9
| 235304 ||  || — || October 18, 2003 || Kitt Peak || Spacewatch || NEM || align=right | 3.2 km || 
|-id=305 bgcolor=#E9E9E9
| 235305 ||  || — || October 19, 2003 || Kitt Peak || Spacewatch || — || align=right | 2.2 km || 
|-id=306 bgcolor=#d6d6d6
| 235306 ||  || — || October 19, 2003 || Kitt Peak || Spacewatch || LUT || align=right | 7.5 km || 
|-id=307 bgcolor=#E9E9E9
| 235307 ||  || — || October 20, 2003 || Socorro || LINEAR || — || align=right | 2.4 km || 
|-id=308 bgcolor=#E9E9E9
| 235308 ||  || — || October 20, 2003 || Kitt Peak || Spacewatch || AGN || align=right | 1.3 km || 
|-id=309 bgcolor=#E9E9E9
| 235309 ||  || — || October 19, 2003 || Kitt Peak || Spacewatch || HOF || align=right | 3.6 km || 
|-id=310 bgcolor=#E9E9E9
| 235310 ||  || — || October 20, 2003 || Kitt Peak || Spacewatch || HOF || align=right | 3.1 km || 
|-id=311 bgcolor=#d6d6d6
| 235311 ||  || — || October 21, 2003 || Kitt Peak || Spacewatch || — || align=right | 2.7 km || 
|-id=312 bgcolor=#E9E9E9
| 235312 ||  || — || October 20, 2003 || Palomar || NEAT || — || align=right | 1.9 km || 
|-id=313 bgcolor=#E9E9E9
| 235313 ||  || — || October 20, 2003 || Palomar || NEAT || — || align=right | 3.2 km || 
|-id=314 bgcolor=#E9E9E9
| 235314 ||  || — || October 16, 2003 || Palomar || NEAT || — || align=right | 2.7 km || 
|-id=315 bgcolor=#E9E9E9
| 235315 ||  || — || October 18, 2003 || Anderson Mesa || LONEOS || MRX || align=right | 1.7 km || 
|-id=316 bgcolor=#E9E9E9
| 235316 ||  || — || October 18, 2003 || Anderson Mesa || LONEOS || — || align=right | 2.7 km || 
|-id=317 bgcolor=#E9E9E9
| 235317 ||  || — || October 21, 2003 || Kitt Peak || Spacewatch || — || align=right | 3.4 km || 
|-id=318 bgcolor=#E9E9E9
| 235318 ||  || — || October 19, 2003 || Kitt Peak || Spacewatch || — || align=right | 3.2 km || 
|-id=319 bgcolor=#d6d6d6
| 235319 ||  || — || October 20, 2003 || Palomar || NEAT || — || align=right | 4.4 km || 
|-id=320 bgcolor=#d6d6d6
| 235320 ||  || — || October 21, 2003 || Kitt Peak || Spacewatch || — || align=right | 2.5 km || 
|-id=321 bgcolor=#d6d6d6
| 235321 ||  || — || October 21, 2003 || Socorro || LINEAR || — || align=right | 5.2 km || 
|-id=322 bgcolor=#d6d6d6
| 235322 ||  || — || October 21, 2003 || Socorro || LINEAR || — || align=right | 3.7 km || 
|-id=323 bgcolor=#E9E9E9
| 235323 ||  || — || October 21, 2003 || Palomar || NEAT || — || align=right | 2.4 km || 
|-id=324 bgcolor=#d6d6d6
| 235324 ||  || — || October 21, 2003 || Kitt Peak || Spacewatch || — || align=right | 4.5 km || 
|-id=325 bgcolor=#E9E9E9
| 235325 ||  || — || October 22, 2003 || Kitt Peak || Spacewatch || — || align=right | 2.7 km || 
|-id=326 bgcolor=#d6d6d6
| 235326 ||  || — || October 22, 2003 || Kitt Peak || Spacewatch || KOR || align=right | 1.9 km || 
|-id=327 bgcolor=#d6d6d6
| 235327 ||  || — || October 23, 2003 || Anderson Mesa || LONEOS || Tj (2.96) || align=right | 6.0 km || 
|-id=328 bgcolor=#E9E9E9
| 235328 ||  || — || October 20, 2003 || Kitt Peak || Spacewatch || — || align=right | 3.0 km || 
|-id=329 bgcolor=#E9E9E9
| 235329 ||  || — || October 21, 2003 || Kitt Peak || Spacewatch || — || align=right | 2.6 km || 
|-id=330 bgcolor=#d6d6d6
| 235330 ||  || — || October 21, 2003 || Kitt Peak || Spacewatch || — || align=right | 4.8 km || 
|-id=331 bgcolor=#E9E9E9
| 235331 ||  || — || October 21, 2003 || Palomar || NEAT || — || align=right | 3.4 km || 
|-id=332 bgcolor=#E9E9E9
| 235332 ||  || — || October 21, 2003 || Socorro || LINEAR || — || align=right | 3.5 km || 
|-id=333 bgcolor=#E9E9E9
| 235333 ||  || — || October 21, 2003 || Socorro || LINEAR || — || align=right | 3.9 km || 
|-id=334 bgcolor=#E9E9E9
| 235334 ||  || — || October 21, 2003 || Kitt Peak || Spacewatch || — || align=right | 2.7 km || 
|-id=335 bgcolor=#E9E9E9
| 235335 ||  || — || October 22, 2003 || Kitt Peak || Spacewatch || HOF || align=right | 3.5 km || 
|-id=336 bgcolor=#E9E9E9
| 235336 ||  || — || October 23, 2003 || Kitt Peak || Spacewatch || — || align=right | 4.3 km || 
|-id=337 bgcolor=#d6d6d6
| 235337 ||  || — || October 21, 2003 || Kitt Peak || Spacewatch || BRA || align=right | 2.6 km || 
|-id=338 bgcolor=#E9E9E9
| 235338 ||  || — || October 21, 2003 || Socorro || LINEAR || — || align=right | 3.6 km || 
|-id=339 bgcolor=#E9E9E9
| 235339 ||  || — || October 22, 2003 || Socorro || LINEAR || — || align=right | 1.5 km || 
|-id=340 bgcolor=#E9E9E9
| 235340 ||  || — || October 22, 2003 || Kitt Peak || Spacewatch || WIT || align=right | 1.5 km || 
|-id=341 bgcolor=#E9E9E9
| 235341 ||  || — || October 23, 2003 || Haleakala || NEAT || — || align=right | 3.1 km || 
|-id=342 bgcolor=#E9E9E9
| 235342 ||  || — || October 24, 2003 || Socorro || LINEAR || — || align=right | 2.0 km || 
|-id=343 bgcolor=#E9E9E9
| 235343 ||  || — || October 24, 2003 || Socorro || LINEAR || — || align=right | 3.6 km || 
|-id=344 bgcolor=#E9E9E9
| 235344 ||  || — || October 25, 2003 || Kitt Peak || Spacewatch || — || align=right | 1.9 km || 
|-id=345 bgcolor=#E9E9E9
| 235345 ||  || — || October 25, 2003 || Socorro || LINEAR || — || align=right | 2.1 km || 
|-id=346 bgcolor=#E9E9E9
| 235346 ||  || — || October 25, 2003 || Socorro || LINEAR || — || align=right | 3.4 km || 
|-id=347 bgcolor=#E9E9E9
| 235347 ||  || — || October 25, 2003 || Kitt Peak || Spacewatch || WIT || align=right | 1.4 km || 
|-id=348 bgcolor=#E9E9E9
| 235348 ||  || — || October 28, 2003 || Socorro || LINEAR || — || align=right | 4.5 km || 
|-id=349 bgcolor=#E9E9E9
| 235349 ||  || — || October 28, 2003 || Socorro || LINEAR || — || align=right | 3.3 km || 
|-id=350 bgcolor=#E9E9E9
| 235350 ||  || — || October 28, 2003 || Kitt Peak || Spacewatch || — || align=right | 1.3 km || 
|-id=351 bgcolor=#d6d6d6
| 235351 ||  || — || October 29, 2003 || Socorro || LINEAR || — || align=right | 4.0 km || 
|-id=352 bgcolor=#E9E9E9
| 235352 ||  || — || October 29, 2003 || Anderson Mesa || LONEOS || KON || align=right | 3.8 km || 
|-id=353 bgcolor=#E9E9E9
| 235353 ||  || — || October 17, 2003 || Kitt Peak || Spacewatch || — || align=right | 3.1 km || 
|-id=354 bgcolor=#d6d6d6
| 235354 ||  || — || October 19, 2003 || Anderson Mesa || LONEOS || LIX || align=right | 4.2 km || 
|-id=355 bgcolor=#d6d6d6
| 235355 ||  || — || October 16, 2003 || Kitt Peak || Spacewatch || — || align=right | 5.9 km || 
|-id=356 bgcolor=#E9E9E9
| 235356 ||  || — || October 17, 2003 || Kitt Peak || Spacewatch || — || align=right | 1.9 km || 
|-id=357 bgcolor=#E9E9E9
| 235357 ||  || — || October 18, 2003 || Apache Point || SDSS || — || align=right | 1.5 km || 
|-id=358 bgcolor=#E9E9E9
| 235358 ||  || — || October 19, 2003 || Apache Point || SDSS || — || align=right | 4.2 km || 
|-id=359 bgcolor=#E9E9E9
| 235359 ||  || — || October 19, 2003 || Kitt Peak || Spacewatch || WIT || align=right | 1.0 km || 
|-id=360 bgcolor=#E9E9E9
| 235360 ||  || — || October 19, 2003 || Kitt Peak || Spacewatch || HOF || align=right | 3.3 km || 
|-id=361 bgcolor=#d6d6d6
| 235361 ||  || — || October 20, 2003 || Kitt Peak || Spacewatch || KOR || align=right | 1.5 km || 
|-id=362 bgcolor=#E9E9E9
| 235362 ||  || — || October 22, 2003 || Apache Point || SDSS || — || align=right | 1.3 km || 
|-id=363 bgcolor=#d6d6d6
| 235363 ||  || — || November 6, 2003 || Socorro || LINEAR || — || align=right | 6.6 km || 
|-id=364 bgcolor=#E9E9E9
| 235364 ||  || — || November 18, 2003 || Palomar || NEAT || — || align=right | 2.7 km || 
|-id=365 bgcolor=#d6d6d6
| 235365 ||  || — || November 16, 2003 || Kitt Peak || Spacewatch || — || align=right | 6.1 km || 
|-id=366 bgcolor=#d6d6d6
| 235366 ||  || — || November 18, 2003 || Palomar || NEAT || — || align=right | 5.7 km || 
|-id=367 bgcolor=#d6d6d6
| 235367 ||  || — || November 19, 2003 || Socorro || LINEAR || — || align=right | 4.3 km || 
|-id=368 bgcolor=#E9E9E9
| 235368 ||  || — || November 18, 2003 || Kitt Peak || Spacewatch || HOF || align=right | 5.0 km || 
|-id=369 bgcolor=#E9E9E9
| 235369 ||  || — || November 18, 2003 || Kitt Peak || Spacewatch || HOF || align=right | 4.6 km || 
|-id=370 bgcolor=#fefefe
| 235370 ||  || — || November 20, 2003 || Socorro || LINEAR || H || align=right | 1.2 km || 
|-id=371 bgcolor=#E9E9E9
| 235371 ||  || — || November 16, 2003 || Kitt Peak || Spacewatch || MRX || align=right | 1.3 km || 
|-id=372 bgcolor=#d6d6d6
| 235372 ||  || — || November 19, 2003 || Socorro || LINEAR || CRO || align=right | 5.6 km || 
|-id=373 bgcolor=#d6d6d6
| 235373 ||  || — || November 19, 2003 || Socorro || LINEAR || — || align=right | 5.6 km || 
|-id=374 bgcolor=#E9E9E9
| 235374 ||  || — || November 19, 2003 || Kitt Peak || Spacewatch || — || align=right | 2.7 km || 
|-id=375 bgcolor=#E9E9E9
| 235375 ||  || — || November 21, 2003 || Socorro || LINEAR || ADE || align=right | 3.9 km || 
|-id=376 bgcolor=#d6d6d6
| 235376 ||  || — || November 19, 2003 || Palomar || NEAT || — || align=right | 3.9 km || 
|-id=377 bgcolor=#d6d6d6
| 235377 ||  || — || November 19, 2003 || Palomar || NEAT || — || align=right | 4.4 km || 
|-id=378 bgcolor=#E9E9E9
| 235378 ||  || — || November 19, 2003 || Catalina || CSS || — || align=right | 3.6 km || 
|-id=379 bgcolor=#E9E9E9
| 235379 ||  || — || November 18, 2003 || Kitt Peak || Spacewatch || WIT || align=right | 1.8 km || 
|-id=380 bgcolor=#E9E9E9
| 235380 ||  || — || November 19, 2003 || Kitt Peak || Spacewatch || — || align=right | 3.5 km || 
|-id=381 bgcolor=#d6d6d6
| 235381 ||  || — || November 19, 2003 || Socorro || LINEAR || TIR || align=right | 4.5 km || 
|-id=382 bgcolor=#E9E9E9
| 235382 ||  || — || November 20, 2003 || Socorro || LINEAR || — || align=right | 4.5 km || 
|-id=383 bgcolor=#E9E9E9
| 235383 ||  || — || November 20, 2003 || Socorro || LINEAR || — || align=right | 2.3 km || 
|-id=384 bgcolor=#E9E9E9
| 235384 ||  || — || November 18, 2003 || Kitt Peak || Spacewatch || ADE || align=right | 3.8 km || 
|-id=385 bgcolor=#d6d6d6
| 235385 ||  || — || November 20, 2003 || Palomar || NEAT || — || align=right | 3.4 km || 
|-id=386 bgcolor=#d6d6d6
| 235386 ||  || — || November 20, 2003 || Socorro || LINEAR || — || align=right | 5.5 km || 
|-id=387 bgcolor=#d6d6d6
| 235387 ||  || — || November 19, 2003 || Anderson Mesa || LONEOS || THM || align=right | 3.4 km || 
|-id=388 bgcolor=#E9E9E9
| 235388 ||  || — || November 19, 2003 || Anderson Mesa || LONEOS || — || align=right | 3.1 km || 
|-id=389 bgcolor=#E9E9E9
| 235389 ||  || — || November 19, 2003 || Anderson Mesa || LONEOS || AGN || align=right | 1.9 km || 
|-id=390 bgcolor=#d6d6d6
| 235390 ||  || — || November 20, 2003 || Socorro || LINEAR || EUP || align=right | 4.9 km || 
|-id=391 bgcolor=#d6d6d6
| 235391 ||  || — || November 21, 2003 || Socorro || LINEAR || — || align=right | 3.0 km || 
|-id=392 bgcolor=#d6d6d6
| 235392 ||  || — || November 20, 2003 || Socorro || LINEAR || — || align=right | 4.7 km || 
|-id=393 bgcolor=#d6d6d6
| 235393 ||  || — || November 21, 2003 || Socorro || LINEAR || — || align=right | 5.2 km || 
|-id=394 bgcolor=#d6d6d6
| 235394 ||  || — || November 21, 2003 || Socorro || LINEAR || — || align=right | 3.3 km || 
|-id=395 bgcolor=#d6d6d6
| 235395 ||  || — || November 26, 2003 || Kitt Peak || Spacewatch || — || align=right | 3.1 km || 
|-id=396 bgcolor=#d6d6d6
| 235396 ||  || — || November 26, 2003 || Kitt Peak || Spacewatch || — || align=right | 4.0 km || 
|-id=397 bgcolor=#d6d6d6
| 235397 ||  || — || November 30, 2003 || Kitt Peak || Spacewatch || KOR || align=right | 1.8 km || 
|-id=398 bgcolor=#E9E9E9
| 235398 ||  || — || November 30, 2003 || Kitt Peak || Spacewatch || — || align=right | 3.9 km || 
|-id=399 bgcolor=#d6d6d6
| 235399 ||  || — || November 30, 2003 || Kitt Peak || Spacewatch || — || align=right | 2.6 km || 
|-id=400 bgcolor=#d6d6d6
| 235400 ||  || — || November 19, 2003 || Palomar || NEAT || LIX || align=right | 6.3 km || 
|}

235401–235500 

|-bgcolor=#d6d6d6
| 235401 ||  || — || November 19, 2003 || Socorro || LINEAR || THB || align=right | 6.2 km || 
|-id=402 bgcolor=#d6d6d6
| 235402 ||  || — || November 18, 2003 || Kitt Peak || Spacewatch || — || align=right | 6.7 km || 
|-id=403 bgcolor=#d6d6d6
| 235403 ||  || — || November 21, 2003 || Kitt Peak || M. W. Buie || KAR || align=right | 1.8 km || 
|-id=404 bgcolor=#d6d6d6
| 235404 ||  || — || December 1, 2003 || Socorro || LINEAR || — || align=right | 2.9 km || 
|-id=405 bgcolor=#d6d6d6
| 235405 ||  || — || December 1, 2003 || Socorro || LINEAR || — || align=right | 3.5 km || 
|-id=406 bgcolor=#d6d6d6
| 235406 ||  || — || December 15, 2003 || Socorro || LINEAR || EUP || align=right | 4.9 km || 
|-id=407 bgcolor=#d6d6d6
| 235407 ||  || — || December 14, 2003 || Kitt Peak || Spacewatch || — || align=right | 4.0 km || 
|-id=408 bgcolor=#d6d6d6
| 235408 ||  || — || December 14, 2003 || Kitt Peak || Spacewatch || — || align=right | 2.7 km || 
|-id=409 bgcolor=#E9E9E9
| 235409 ||  || — || December 1, 2003 || Kitt Peak || Spacewatch || — || align=right | 4.5 km || 
|-id=410 bgcolor=#E9E9E9
| 235410 ||  || — || December 1, 2003 || Kitt Peak || Spacewatch || AGN || align=right | 1.3 km || 
|-id=411 bgcolor=#d6d6d6
| 235411 ||  || — || December 1, 2003 || Kitt Peak || Spacewatch || — || align=right | 2.5 km || 
|-id=412 bgcolor=#d6d6d6
| 235412 ||  || — || December 4, 2003 || Socorro || LINEAR || — || align=right | 4.5 km || 
|-id=413 bgcolor=#d6d6d6
| 235413 ||  || — || December 19, 2003 || Nashville || R. Clingan || THM || align=right | 3.5 km || 
|-id=414 bgcolor=#d6d6d6
| 235414 ||  || — || December 17, 2003 || Socorro || LINEAR || — || align=right | 5.1 km || 
|-id=415 bgcolor=#d6d6d6
| 235415 ||  || — || December 17, 2003 || Anderson Mesa || LONEOS || — || align=right | 5.6 km || 
|-id=416 bgcolor=#d6d6d6
| 235416 ||  || — || December 17, 2003 || Kitt Peak || Spacewatch || — || align=right | 3.1 km || 
|-id=417 bgcolor=#d6d6d6
| 235417 ||  || — || December 17, 2003 || Kitt Peak || Spacewatch || 637 || align=right | 3.5 km || 
|-id=418 bgcolor=#d6d6d6
| 235418 ||  || — || December 18, 2003 || Socorro || LINEAR || — || align=right | 4.7 km || 
|-id=419 bgcolor=#d6d6d6
| 235419 ||  || — || December 18, 2003 || Socorro || LINEAR || ALA || align=right | 5.7 km || 
|-id=420 bgcolor=#d6d6d6
| 235420 ||  || — || December 17, 2003 || Socorro || LINEAR || NAE || align=right | 5.8 km || 
|-id=421 bgcolor=#d6d6d6
| 235421 ||  || — || December 18, 2003 || Socorro || LINEAR || EOS || align=right | 3.3 km || 
|-id=422 bgcolor=#d6d6d6
| 235422 ||  || — || December 19, 2003 || Kitt Peak || Spacewatch || MEL || align=right | 4.0 km || 
|-id=423 bgcolor=#d6d6d6
| 235423 ||  || — || December 17, 2003 || Anderson Mesa || LONEOS || — || align=right | 3.1 km || 
|-id=424 bgcolor=#d6d6d6
| 235424 ||  || — || December 18, 2003 || Socorro || LINEAR || — || align=right | 4.1 km || 
|-id=425 bgcolor=#E9E9E9
| 235425 ||  || — || December 20, 2003 || Socorro || LINEAR || — || align=right | 3.4 km || 
|-id=426 bgcolor=#d6d6d6
| 235426 ||  || — || December 21, 2003 || Socorro || LINEAR || — || align=right | 2.9 km || 
|-id=427 bgcolor=#fefefe
| 235427 ||  || — || December 19, 2003 || Socorro || LINEAR || H || align=right data-sort-value="0.90" | 900 m || 
|-id=428 bgcolor=#d6d6d6
| 235428 ||  || — || December 18, 2003 || Socorro || LINEAR || — || align=right | 6.8 km || 
|-id=429 bgcolor=#d6d6d6
| 235429 ||  || — || December 18, 2003 || Socorro || LINEAR || — || align=right | 4.1 km || 
|-id=430 bgcolor=#d6d6d6
| 235430 ||  || — || December 18, 2003 || Socorro || LINEAR || — || align=right | 3.8 km || 
|-id=431 bgcolor=#d6d6d6
| 235431 ||  || — || December 19, 2003 || Socorro || LINEAR || THB || align=right | 4.2 km || 
|-id=432 bgcolor=#d6d6d6
| 235432 ||  || — || December 21, 2003 || Socorro || LINEAR || URS || align=right | 4.7 km || 
|-id=433 bgcolor=#d6d6d6
| 235433 ||  || — || December 21, 2003 || Kitt Peak || Spacewatch || EUP || align=right | 5.6 km || 
|-id=434 bgcolor=#E9E9E9
| 235434 ||  || — || December 19, 2003 || Socorro || LINEAR || — || align=right | 3.4 km || 
|-id=435 bgcolor=#d6d6d6
| 235435 ||  || — || December 22, 2003 || Socorro || LINEAR || — || align=right | 4.7 km || 
|-id=436 bgcolor=#d6d6d6
| 235436 ||  || — || December 22, 2003 || Kitt Peak || Spacewatch || — || align=right | 3.3 km || 
|-id=437 bgcolor=#d6d6d6
| 235437 ||  || — || December 23, 2003 || Socorro || LINEAR || — || align=right | 4.1 km || 
|-id=438 bgcolor=#d6d6d6
| 235438 ||  || — || December 23, 2003 || Socorro || LINEAR || — || align=right | 3.8 km || 
|-id=439 bgcolor=#d6d6d6
| 235439 ||  || — || December 27, 2003 || Socorro || LINEAR || — || align=right | 2.4 km || 
|-id=440 bgcolor=#d6d6d6
| 235440 ||  || — || December 27, 2003 || Socorro || LINEAR || — || align=right | 3.3 km || 
|-id=441 bgcolor=#d6d6d6
| 235441 ||  || — || December 28, 2003 || Kitt Peak || Spacewatch || K-2 || align=right | 1.6 km || 
|-id=442 bgcolor=#d6d6d6
| 235442 ||  || — || December 28, 2003 || Socorro || LINEAR || EOS || align=right | 2.6 km || 
|-id=443 bgcolor=#d6d6d6
| 235443 ||  || — || December 28, 2003 || Socorro || LINEAR || — || align=right | 4.5 km || 
|-id=444 bgcolor=#d6d6d6
| 235444 ||  || — || December 28, 2003 || Socorro || LINEAR || — || align=right | 4.3 km || 
|-id=445 bgcolor=#d6d6d6
| 235445 ||  || — || December 28, 2003 || Socorro || LINEAR || — || align=right | 6.3 km || 
|-id=446 bgcolor=#d6d6d6
| 235446 ||  || — || December 28, 2003 || Kitt Peak || Spacewatch || — || align=right | 5.1 km || 
|-id=447 bgcolor=#d6d6d6
| 235447 ||  || — || December 28, 2003 || Socorro || LINEAR || EOS || align=right | 2.8 km || 
|-id=448 bgcolor=#d6d6d6
| 235448 ||  || — || December 28, 2003 || Socorro || LINEAR || — || align=right | 3.9 km || 
|-id=449 bgcolor=#d6d6d6
| 235449 ||  || — || December 28, 2003 || Socorro || LINEAR || LIX || align=right | 4.1 km || 
|-id=450 bgcolor=#d6d6d6
| 235450 ||  || — || December 29, 2003 || Socorro || LINEAR || — || align=right | 4.2 km || 
|-id=451 bgcolor=#d6d6d6
| 235451 ||  || — || December 29, 2003 || Catalina || CSS || THB || align=right | 4.2 km || 
|-id=452 bgcolor=#d6d6d6
| 235452 ||  || — || December 29, 2003 || Socorro || LINEAR || 7:4 || align=right | 6.3 km || 
|-id=453 bgcolor=#d6d6d6
| 235453 ||  || — || December 29, 2003 || Catalina || CSS || — || align=right | 4.9 km || 
|-id=454 bgcolor=#d6d6d6
| 235454 ||  || — || December 29, 2003 || Socorro || LINEAR || — || align=right | 3.3 km || 
|-id=455 bgcolor=#d6d6d6
| 235455 ||  || — || December 29, 2003 || Catalina || CSS || — || align=right | 3.7 km || 
|-id=456 bgcolor=#d6d6d6
| 235456 ||  || — || December 29, 2003 || Catalina || CSS || MEL || align=right | 3.7 km || 
|-id=457 bgcolor=#d6d6d6
| 235457 ||  || — || December 29, 2003 || Socorro || LINEAR || — || align=right | 5.4 km || 
|-id=458 bgcolor=#d6d6d6
| 235458 ||  || — || December 16, 2003 || Kitt Peak || Spacewatch || — || align=right | 4.4 km || 
|-id=459 bgcolor=#d6d6d6
| 235459 ||  || — || December 17, 2003 || Socorro || LINEAR || — || align=right | 3.9 km || 
|-id=460 bgcolor=#d6d6d6
| 235460 ||  || — || December 17, 2003 || Socorro || LINEAR || — || align=right | 5.8 km || 
|-id=461 bgcolor=#d6d6d6
| 235461 ||  || — || December 17, 2003 || Kitt Peak || Spacewatch || — || align=right | 3.4 km || 
|-id=462 bgcolor=#d6d6d6
| 235462 ||  || — || December 17, 2003 || Kitt Peak || Spacewatch || KOR || align=right | 1.9 km || 
|-id=463 bgcolor=#d6d6d6
| 235463 ||  || — || December 17, 2003 || Kitt Peak || Spacewatch || THM || align=right | 2.0 km || 
|-id=464 bgcolor=#d6d6d6
| 235464 ||  || — || December 17, 2003 || Anderson Mesa || LONEOS || EOS || align=right | 3.1 km || 
|-id=465 bgcolor=#d6d6d6
| 235465 ||  || — || December 19, 2003 || Kitt Peak || Spacewatch || — || align=right | 2.8 km || 
|-id=466 bgcolor=#d6d6d6
| 235466 ||  || — || December 29, 2003 || Kitt Peak || Spacewatch || THM || align=right | 3.4 km || 
|-id=467 bgcolor=#d6d6d6
| 235467 ||  || — || January 5, 2004 || Catalina || CSS || TIR || align=right | 4.3 km || 
|-id=468 bgcolor=#d6d6d6
| 235468 ||  || — || January 11, 2004 || Palomar || NEAT || — || align=right | 5.0 km || 
|-id=469 bgcolor=#d6d6d6
| 235469 ||  || — || January 13, 2004 || Palomar || NEAT || EOS || align=right | 2.7 km || 
|-id=470 bgcolor=#d6d6d6
| 235470 ||  || — || January 15, 2004 || Kitt Peak || Spacewatch || THM || align=right | 2.9 km || 
|-id=471 bgcolor=#d6d6d6
| 235471 ||  || — || January 18, 2004 || Palomar || NEAT || — || align=right | 2.7 km || 
|-id=472 bgcolor=#d6d6d6
| 235472 ||  || — || January 18, 2004 || Catalina || CSS || — || align=right | 5.5 km || 
|-id=473 bgcolor=#d6d6d6
| 235473 ||  || — || January 18, 2004 || Catalina || CSS || — || align=right | 4.1 km || 
|-id=474 bgcolor=#d6d6d6
| 235474 ||  || — || January 18, 2004 || Palomar || NEAT || — || align=right | 5.7 km || 
|-id=475 bgcolor=#d6d6d6
| 235475 ||  || — || January 19, 2004 || Catalina || CSS || EOS || align=right | 3.2 km || 
|-id=476 bgcolor=#d6d6d6
| 235476 ||  || — || January 19, 2004 || Kitt Peak || Spacewatch || — || align=right | 3.7 km || 
|-id=477 bgcolor=#d6d6d6
| 235477 ||  || — || January 19, 2004 || Kitt Peak || Spacewatch || — || align=right | 3.4 km || 
|-id=478 bgcolor=#d6d6d6
| 235478 ||  || — || January 19, 2004 || Kitt Peak || Spacewatch || — || align=right | 2.8 km || 
|-id=479 bgcolor=#d6d6d6
| 235479 ||  || — || January 19, 2004 || Catalina || CSS || Tj (2.96) || align=right | 6.3 km || 
|-id=480 bgcolor=#d6d6d6
| 235480 ||  || — || January 21, 2004 || Socorro || LINEAR || — || align=right | 3.9 km || 
|-id=481 bgcolor=#d6d6d6
| 235481 ||  || — || January 21, 2004 || Socorro || LINEAR || — || align=right | 3.8 km || 
|-id=482 bgcolor=#d6d6d6
| 235482 ||  || — || January 21, 2004 || Socorro || LINEAR || — || align=right | 5.0 km || 
|-id=483 bgcolor=#d6d6d6
| 235483 ||  || — || January 21, 2004 || Socorro || LINEAR || URS || align=right | 6.5 km || 
|-id=484 bgcolor=#d6d6d6
| 235484 ||  || — || January 22, 2004 || Socorro || LINEAR || — || align=right | 3.2 km || 
|-id=485 bgcolor=#d6d6d6
| 235485 ||  || — || January 23, 2004 || Anderson Mesa || LONEOS || — || align=right | 4.3 km || 
|-id=486 bgcolor=#d6d6d6
| 235486 ||  || — || January 22, 2004 || Socorro || LINEAR || — || align=right | 2.9 km || 
|-id=487 bgcolor=#d6d6d6
| 235487 ||  || — || January 24, 2004 || Socorro || LINEAR || — || align=right | 5.5 km || 
|-id=488 bgcolor=#d6d6d6
| 235488 ||  || — || January 24, 2004 || Socorro || LINEAR || — || align=right | 3.6 km || 
|-id=489 bgcolor=#d6d6d6
| 235489 ||  || — || January 24, 2004 || Socorro || LINEAR || — || align=right | 5.1 km || 
|-id=490 bgcolor=#d6d6d6
| 235490 ||  || — || January 24, 2004 || Socorro || LINEAR || TIR || align=right | 5.0 km || 
|-id=491 bgcolor=#d6d6d6
| 235491 ||  || — || January 22, 2004 || Socorro || LINEAR || EUP || align=right | 4.8 km || 
|-id=492 bgcolor=#d6d6d6
| 235492 ||  || — || January 23, 2004 || Socorro || LINEAR || THB || align=right | 4.6 km || 
|-id=493 bgcolor=#d6d6d6
| 235493 ||  || — || January 24, 2004 || Socorro || LINEAR || ALA || align=right | 5.5 km || 
|-id=494 bgcolor=#d6d6d6
| 235494 ||  || — || January 26, 2004 || Anderson Mesa || LONEOS || — || align=right | 4.5 km || 
|-id=495 bgcolor=#d6d6d6
| 235495 ||  || — || January 26, 2004 || Anderson Mesa || LONEOS || EUP || align=right | 6.5 km || 
|-id=496 bgcolor=#d6d6d6
| 235496 ||  || — || January 28, 2004 || Socorro || LINEAR || THB || align=right | 4.8 km || 
|-id=497 bgcolor=#d6d6d6
| 235497 ||  || — || January 28, 2004 || Socorro || LINEAR || EUP || align=right | 7.3 km || 
|-id=498 bgcolor=#d6d6d6
| 235498 ||  || — || January 24, 2004 || Socorro || LINEAR || EUP || align=right | 6.1 km || 
|-id=499 bgcolor=#d6d6d6
| 235499 ||  || — || January 28, 2004 || Socorro || LINEAR || — || align=right | 6.5 km || 
|-id=500 bgcolor=#d6d6d6
| 235500 ||  || — || January 29, 2004 || Socorro || LINEAR || — || align=right | 5.6 km || 
|}

235501–235600 

|-bgcolor=#d6d6d6
| 235501 ||  || — || January 31, 2004 || Socorro || LINEAR || EUP || align=right | 6.2 km || 
|-id=502 bgcolor=#d6d6d6
| 235502 ||  || — || January 26, 2004 || Anderson Mesa || LONEOS || — || align=right | 3.3 km || 
|-id=503 bgcolor=#d6d6d6
| 235503 ||  || — || January 26, 2004 || Anderson Mesa || LONEOS || EOS || align=right | 3.1 km || 
|-id=504 bgcolor=#d6d6d6
| 235504 ||  || — || January 29, 2004 || Catalina || CSS || EUP || align=right | 7.0 km || 
|-id=505 bgcolor=#d6d6d6
| 235505 ||  || — || January 26, 2004 || Anderson Mesa || LONEOS || EOS || align=right | 4.9 km || 
|-id=506 bgcolor=#d6d6d6
| 235506 ||  || — || January 30, 2004 || Socorro || LINEAR || EMA || align=right | 5.4 km || 
|-id=507 bgcolor=#d6d6d6
| 235507 ||  || — || January 31, 2004 || Socorro || LINEAR || — || align=right | 5.5 km || 
|-id=508 bgcolor=#d6d6d6
| 235508 ||  || — || January 17, 2004 || Palomar || NEAT || — || align=right | 3.7 km || 
|-id=509 bgcolor=#d6d6d6
| 235509 ||  || — || January 19, 2004 || Kitt Peak || Spacewatch || — || align=right | 2.9 km || 
|-id=510 bgcolor=#d6d6d6
| 235510 ||  || — || January 22, 2004 || Socorro || LINEAR || — || align=right | 3.9 km || 
|-id=511 bgcolor=#d6d6d6
| 235511 ||  || — || January 16, 2004 || Kitt Peak || Spacewatch || — || align=right | 3.1 km || 
|-id=512 bgcolor=#d6d6d6
| 235512 ||  || — || January 16, 2004 || Kitt Peak || Spacewatch || — || align=right | 4.5 km || 
|-id=513 bgcolor=#d6d6d6
| 235513 ||  || — || January 20, 2004 || Socorro || LINEAR || — || align=right | 4.9 km || 
|-id=514 bgcolor=#d6d6d6
| 235514 ||  || — || January 27, 2004 || Kitt Peak || Spacewatch || THM || align=right | 2.2 km || 
|-id=515 bgcolor=#d6d6d6
| 235515 ||  || — || January 28, 2004 || Kitt Peak || Spacewatch || HYG || align=right | 2.7 km || 
|-id=516 bgcolor=#d6d6d6
| 235516 ||  || — || January 28, 2004 || Socorro || LINEAR || — || align=right | 5.2 km || 
|-id=517 bgcolor=#d6d6d6
| 235517 ||  || — || January 19, 2004 || Kitt Peak || Spacewatch || — || align=right | 3.7 km || 
|-id=518 bgcolor=#d6d6d6
| 235518 ||  || — || February 12, 2004 || Desert Eagle || W. K. Y. Yeung || — || align=right | 3.1 km || 
|-id=519 bgcolor=#d6d6d6
| 235519 ||  || — || February 9, 2004 || Palomar || NEAT || — || align=right | 4.2 km || 
|-id=520 bgcolor=#d6d6d6
| 235520 ||  || — || February 9, 2004 || Palomar || NEAT || EOS || align=right | 2.9 km || 
|-id=521 bgcolor=#d6d6d6
| 235521 ||  || — || February 10, 2004 || Palomar || NEAT || — || align=right | 3.3 km || 
|-id=522 bgcolor=#d6d6d6
| 235522 ||  || — || February 10, 2004 || Palomar || NEAT || — || align=right | 5.0 km || 
|-id=523 bgcolor=#d6d6d6
| 235523 ||  || — || February 11, 2004 || Kitt Peak || Spacewatch || — || align=right | 3.2 km || 
|-id=524 bgcolor=#d6d6d6
| 235524 ||  || — || February 11, 2004 || Anderson Mesa || LONEOS || — || align=right | 4.1 km || 
|-id=525 bgcolor=#d6d6d6
| 235525 ||  || — || February 12, 2004 || Kitt Peak || Spacewatch || — || align=right | 3.6 km || 
|-id=526 bgcolor=#d6d6d6
| 235526 ||  || — || February 13, 2004 || Desert Eagle || W. K. Y. Yeung || ALA || align=right | 4.7 km || 
|-id=527 bgcolor=#d6d6d6
| 235527 ||  || — || February 11, 2004 || Palomar || NEAT || — || align=right | 4.1 km || 
|-id=528 bgcolor=#d6d6d6
| 235528 ||  || — || February 11, 2004 || Palomar || NEAT || — || align=right | 3.4 km || 
|-id=529 bgcolor=#d6d6d6
| 235529 ||  || — || February 12, 2004 || Palomar || NEAT || EOS || align=right | 2.8 km || 
|-id=530 bgcolor=#d6d6d6
| 235530 ||  || — || February 12, 2004 || Palomar || NEAT || — || align=right | 6.2 km || 
|-id=531 bgcolor=#d6d6d6
| 235531 ||  || — || February 10, 2004 || Palomar || NEAT || HYG || align=right | 3.1 km || 
|-id=532 bgcolor=#d6d6d6
| 235532 ||  || — || February 10, 2004 || Palomar || NEAT || TIR || align=right | 4.5 km || 
|-id=533 bgcolor=#d6d6d6
| 235533 ||  || — || February 12, 2004 || Kitt Peak || Spacewatch || — || align=right | 4.4 km || 
|-id=534 bgcolor=#d6d6d6
| 235534 ||  || — || February 12, 2004 || Kitt Peak || Spacewatch || THM || align=right | 3.1 km || 
|-id=535 bgcolor=#d6d6d6
| 235535 ||  || — || February 12, 2004 || Kitt Peak || Spacewatch || HYG || align=right | 3.7 km || 
|-id=536 bgcolor=#d6d6d6
| 235536 ||  || — || February 12, 2004 || Kitt Peak || Spacewatch || — || align=right | 4.5 km || 
|-id=537 bgcolor=#d6d6d6
| 235537 ||  || — || February 12, 2004 || Palomar || NEAT || HYG || align=right | 4.4 km || 
|-id=538 bgcolor=#d6d6d6
| 235538 ||  || — || February 12, 2004 || Palomar || NEAT || — || align=right | 3.4 km || 
|-id=539 bgcolor=#d6d6d6
| 235539 ||  || — || February 14, 2004 || Palomar || NEAT || — || align=right | 4.0 km || 
|-id=540 bgcolor=#d6d6d6
| 235540 ||  || — || February 14, 2004 || Haleakala || NEAT || VER || align=right | 5.1 km || 
|-id=541 bgcolor=#d6d6d6
| 235541 ||  || — || February 13, 2004 || Anderson Mesa || LONEOS || — || align=right | 3.3 km || 
|-id=542 bgcolor=#d6d6d6
| 235542 ||  || — || February 16, 2004 || Kitt Peak || Spacewatch || — || align=right | 4.3 km || 
|-id=543 bgcolor=#d6d6d6
| 235543 ||  || — || February 17, 2004 || Socorro || LINEAR || — || align=right | 4.7 km || 
|-id=544 bgcolor=#d6d6d6
| 235544 ||  || — || February 17, 2004 || Socorro || LINEAR || ALA || align=right | 5.4 km || 
|-id=545 bgcolor=#d6d6d6
| 235545 ||  || — || February 17, 2004 || Socorro || LINEAR || — || align=right | 4.1 km || 
|-id=546 bgcolor=#d6d6d6
| 235546 ||  || — || February 16, 2004 || Socorro || LINEAR || — || align=right | 2.5 km || 
|-id=547 bgcolor=#d6d6d6
| 235547 ||  || — || February 16, 2004 || Kitt Peak || Spacewatch || 7:4 || align=right | 3.1 km || 
|-id=548 bgcolor=#d6d6d6
| 235548 ||  || — || February 17, 2004 || Kitt Peak || Spacewatch || — || align=right | 3.9 km || 
|-id=549 bgcolor=#d6d6d6
| 235549 ||  || — || February 23, 2004 || Socorro || LINEAR || — || align=right | 4.6 km || 
|-id=550 bgcolor=#d6d6d6
| 235550 ||  || — || March 11, 2004 || Palomar || NEAT || VER || align=right | 5.7 km || 
|-id=551 bgcolor=#d6d6d6
| 235551 ||  || — || March 14, 2004 || Socorro || LINEAR || — || align=right | 4.4 km || 
|-id=552 bgcolor=#d6d6d6
| 235552 ||  || — || March 12, 2004 || Palomar || NEAT || HYG || align=right | 4.3 km || 
|-id=553 bgcolor=#d6d6d6
| 235553 ||  || — || March 13, 2004 || Palomar || NEAT || — || align=right | 5.9 km || 
|-id=554 bgcolor=#d6d6d6
| 235554 ||  || — || March 15, 2004 || Socorro || LINEAR || HYG || align=right | 4.2 km || 
|-id=555 bgcolor=#d6d6d6
| 235555 ||  || — || March 15, 2004 || Kitt Peak || Spacewatch || — || align=right | 5.9 km || 
|-id=556 bgcolor=#d6d6d6
| 235556 ||  || — || March 16, 2004 || Kitt Peak || Spacewatch || ALA || align=right | 4.0 km || 
|-id=557 bgcolor=#d6d6d6
| 235557 ||  || — || March 17, 2004 || Kitt Peak || Spacewatch || VER || align=right | 4.3 km || 
|-id=558 bgcolor=#d6d6d6
| 235558 ||  || — || March 18, 2004 || Kitt Peak || Spacewatch || — || align=right | 4.7 km || 
|-id=559 bgcolor=#d6d6d6
| 235559 ||  || — || March 18, 2004 || Socorro || LINEAR || — || align=right | 4.4 km || 
|-id=560 bgcolor=#fefefe
| 235560 ||  || — || March 19, 2004 || Socorro || LINEAR || — || align=right | 1.5 km || 
|-id=561 bgcolor=#d6d6d6
| 235561 ||  || — || March 18, 2004 || Kitt Peak || Spacewatch || THM || align=right | 3.0 km || 
|-id=562 bgcolor=#fefefe
| 235562 ||  || — || April 11, 2004 || Catalina || CSS || — || align=right | 2.3 km || 
|-id=563 bgcolor=#fefefe
| 235563 ||  || — || April 13, 2004 || Siding Spring || SSS || — || align=right | 2.3 km || 
|-id=564 bgcolor=#fefefe
| 235564 ||  || — || April 12, 2004 || Kitt Peak || Spacewatch || — || align=right data-sort-value="0.71" | 710 m || 
|-id=565 bgcolor=#fefefe
| 235565 ||  || — || April 15, 2004 || Siding Spring || SSS || — || align=right | 1.2 km || 
|-id=566 bgcolor=#d6d6d6
| 235566 ||  || — || April 14, 2004 || Bergisch Gladbach || W. Bickel || — || align=right | 4.5 km || 
|-id=567 bgcolor=#d6d6d6
| 235567 ||  || — || April 16, 2004 || Kitt Peak || Spacewatch || 3:2 || align=right | 6.7 km || 
|-id=568 bgcolor=#d6d6d6
| 235568 ||  || — || April 16, 2004 || Socorro || LINEAR || EUP || align=right | 5.1 km || 
|-id=569 bgcolor=#d6d6d6
| 235569 ||  || — || April 25, 2004 || Catalina || CSS || — || align=right | 6.1 km || 
|-id=570 bgcolor=#d6d6d6
| 235570 ||  || — || April 24, 2004 || Socorro || LINEAR || ELF || align=right | 7.0 km || 
|-id=571 bgcolor=#E9E9E9
| 235571 ||  || — || May 15, 2004 || Socorro || LINEAR || — || align=right | 3.8 km || 
|-id=572 bgcolor=#d6d6d6
| 235572 ||  || — || May 11, 2004 || Anderson Mesa || LONEOS || EUP || align=right | 4.7 km || 
|-id=573 bgcolor=#fefefe
| 235573 ||  || — || May 21, 2004 || Socorro || LINEAR || — || align=right | 1.3 km || 
|-id=574 bgcolor=#d6d6d6
| 235574 ||  || — || May 18, 2004 || Socorro || LINEAR || 7:4 || align=right | 6.5 km || 
|-id=575 bgcolor=#fefefe
| 235575 ||  || — || May 22, 2004 || Socorro || LINEAR || — || align=right | 1.0 km || 
|-id=576 bgcolor=#E9E9E9
| 235576 ||  || — || June 12, 2004 || Palomar || NEAT || — || align=right | 3.8 km || 
|-id=577 bgcolor=#fefefe
| 235577 ||  || — || June 14, 2004 || Kitt Peak || Spacewatch || FLO || align=right data-sort-value="0.76" | 760 m || 
|-id=578 bgcolor=#fefefe
| 235578 ||  || — || June 18, 2004 || Socorro || LINEAR || PHO || align=right | 3.2 km || 
|-id=579 bgcolor=#E9E9E9
| 235579 ||  || — || June 18, 2004 || Catalina || CSS || — || align=right | 3.2 km || 
|-id=580 bgcolor=#fefefe
| 235580 ||  || — || July 11, 2004 || Socorro || LINEAR || FLO || align=right | 1.3 km || 
|-id=581 bgcolor=#E9E9E9
| 235581 ||  || — || July 10, 2004 || Palomar || NEAT || HOF || align=right | 3.2 km || 
|-id=582 bgcolor=#fefefe
| 235582 ||  || — || July 10, 2004 || Catalina || CSS || V || align=right data-sort-value="0.95" | 950 m || 
|-id=583 bgcolor=#fefefe
| 235583 ||  || — || July 16, 2004 || Socorro || LINEAR || — || align=right data-sort-value="0.97" | 970 m || 
|-id=584 bgcolor=#d6d6d6
| 235584 ||  || — || July 16, 2004 || Socorro || LINEAR || 3:2 || align=right | 7.5 km || 
|-id=585 bgcolor=#fefefe
| 235585 ||  || — || August 6, 2004 || Reedy Creek || J. Broughton || V || align=right data-sort-value="0.92" | 920 m || 
|-id=586 bgcolor=#fefefe
| 235586 ||  || — || August 3, 2004 || Siding Spring || SSS || — || align=right data-sort-value="0.86" | 860 m || 
|-id=587 bgcolor=#fefefe
| 235587 ||  || — || August 6, 2004 || Palomar || NEAT || — || align=right | 1.2 km || 
|-id=588 bgcolor=#fefefe
| 235588 ||  || — || August 6, 2004 || Palomar || NEAT || — || align=right | 2.5 km || 
|-id=589 bgcolor=#fefefe
| 235589 ||  || — || August 7, 2004 || Palomar || NEAT || V || align=right data-sort-value="0.85" | 850 m || 
|-id=590 bgcolor=#fefefe
| 235590 ||  || — || August 7, 2004 || Siding Spring || SSS || — || align=right | 1.2 km || 
|-id=591 bgcolor=#E9E9E9
| 235591 ||  || — || August 8, 2004 || Socorro || LINEAR || — || align=right | 3.7 km || 
|-id=592 bgcolor=#fefefe
| 235592 ||  || — || August 6, 2004 || Palomar || NEAT || — || align=right | 1.1 km || 
|-id=593 bgcolor=#fefefe
| 235593 ||  || — || August 6, 2004 || Palomar || NEAT || V || align=right data-sort-value="0.90" | 900 m || 
|-id=594 bgcolor=#fefefe
| 235594 ||  || — || August 9, 2004 || Socorro || LINEAR || NYS || align=right data-sort-value="0.96" | 960 m || 
|-id=595 bgcolor=#fefefe
| 235595 ||  || — || August 7, 2004 || Palomar || NEAT || V || align=right | 1.0 km || 
|-id=596 bgcolor=#fefefe
| 235596 ||  || — || August 7, 2004 || Campo Imperatore || CINEOS || V || align=right data-sort-value="0.69" | 690 m || 
|-id=597 bgcolor=#fefefe
| 235597 ||  || — || August 8, 2004 || Palomar || NEAT || — || align=right | 1.2 km || 
|-id=598 bgcolor=#fefefe
| 235598 ||  || — || August 8, 2004 || Socorro || LINEAR || — || align=right | 1.2 km || 
|-id=599 bgcolor=#fefefe
| 235599 ||  || — || August 8, 2004 || Socorro || LINEAR || — || align=right | 1.3 km || 
|-id=600 bgcolor=#fefefe
| 235600 ||  || — || August 8, 2004 || Anderson Mesa || LONEOS || — || align=right | 1.1 km || 
|}

235601–235700 

|-bgcolor=#FA8072
| 235601 ||  || — || August 9, 2004 || Socorro || LINEAR || — || align=right | 1.2 km || 
|-id=602 bgcolor=#fefefe
| 235602 ||  || — || August 9, 2004 || Anderson Mesa || LONEOS || — || align=right | 2.2 km || 
|-id=603 bgcolor=#fefefe
| 235603 ||  || — || August 9, 2004 || Socorro || LINEAR || V || align=right data-sort-value="0.72" | 720 m || 
|-id=604 bgcolor=#fefefe
| 235604 ||  || — || August 9, 2004 || Socorro || LINEAR || — || align=right | 1.4 km || 
|-id=605 bgcolor=#fefefe
| 235605 ||  || — || August 10, 2004 || Socorro || LINEAR || NYS || align=right | 1.0 km || 
|-id=606 bgcolor=#fefefe
| 235606 ||  || — || August 7, 2004 || Palomar || NEAT || V || align=right data-sort-value="0.81" | 810 m || 
|-id=607 bgcolor=#fefefe
| 235607 ||  || — || August 8, 2004 || Socorro || LINEAR || — || align=right | 1.4 km || 
|-id=608 bgcolor=#E9E9E9
| 235608 ||  || — || August 9, 2004 || Socorro || LINEAR || — || align=right | 3.8 km || 
|-id=609 bgcolor=#fefefe
| 235609 ||  || — || August 10, 2004 || Socorro || LINEAR || — || align=right | 1.1 km || 
|-id=610 bgcolor=#E9E9E9
| 235610 ||  || — || August 12, 2004 || Palomar || NEAT || — || align=right | 4.1 km || 
|-id=611 bgcolor=#fefefe
| 235611 ||  || — || August 11, 2004 || Socorro || LINEAR || — || align=right | 1.0 km || 
|-id=612 bgcolor=#fefefe
| 235612 ||  || — || August 11, 2004 || Socorro || LINEAR || — || align=right | 1.5 km || 
|-id=613 bgcolor=#fefefe
| 235613 ||  || — || August 12, 2004 || Socorro || LINEAR || V || align=right data-sort-value="0.88" | 880 m || 
|-id=614 bgcolor=#fefefe
| 235614 ||  || — || August 12, 2004 || Socorro || LINEAR || — || align=right | 4.0 km || 
|-id=615 bgcolor=#E9E9E9
| 235615 ||  || — || August 13, 2004 || Andrushivka || Andrushivka Obs. || — || align=right | 4.1 km || 
|-id=616 bgcolor=#fefefe
| 235616 ||  || — || August 15, 2004 || Siding Spring || SSS || NYS || align=right | 1.9 km || 
|-id=617 bgcolor=#fefefe
| 235617 ||  || — || August 15, 2004 || Siding Spring || SSS || V || align=right | 1.3 km || 
|-id=618 bgcolor=#fefefe
| 235618 ||  || — || August 22, 2004 || Bergisch Gladbac || W. Bickel || FLO || align=right data-sort-value="0.95" | 950 m || 
|-id=619 bgcolor=#fefefe
| 235619 ||  || — || August 19, 2004 || Siding Spring || SSS || — || align=right | 1.2 km || 
|-id=620 bgcolor=#fefefe
| 235620 ||  || — || September 5, 2004 || Bergisch Gladbac || W. Bickel || — || align=right data-sort-value="0.79" | 790 m || 
|-id=621 bgcolor=#fefefe
| 235621 Kratochvíle ||  ||  || September 5, 2004 || Kleť || KLENOT || V || align=right data-sort-value="0.74" | 740 m || 
|-id=622 bgcolor=#E9E9E9
| 235622 ||  || — || September 3, 2004 || Anderson Mesa || LONEOS || MIT || align=right | 4.2 km || 
|-id=623 bgcolor=#fefefe
| 235623 ||  || — || September 4, 2004 || Needville || Needville Obs. || — || align=right | 2.1 km || 
|-id=624 bgcolor=#fefefe
| 235624 ||  || — || September 6, 2004 || Needville || Needville Obs. || — || align=right | 1.4 km || 
|-id=625 bgcolor=#fefefe
| 235625 ||  || — || September 7, 2004 || Kitt Peak || Spacewatch || NYS || align=right data-sort-value="0.94" | 940 m || 
|-id=626 bgcolor=#fefefe
| 235626 ||  || — || September 7, 2004 || Socorro || LINEAR || FLO || align=right | 1.0 km || 
|-id=627 bgcolor=#fefefe
| 235627 ||  || — || September 7, 2004 || Kitt Peak || Spacewatch || V || align=right | 1.0 km || 
|-id=628 bgcolor=#fefefe
| 235628 ||  || — || September 7, 2004 || Socorro || LINEAR || — || align=right | 1.2 km || 
|-id=629 bgcolor=#E9E9E9
| 235629 ||  || — || September 7, 2004 || Socorro || LINEAR || — || align=right | 3.7 km || 
|-id=630 bgcolor=#fefefe
| 235630 ||  || — || September 7, 2004 || Socorro || LINEAR || — || align=right data-sort-value="0.98" | 980 m || 
|-id=631 bgcolor=#fefefe
| 235631 ||  || — || September 7, 2004 || Kitt Peak || Spacewatch || V || align=right data-sort-value="0.80" | 800 m || 
|-id=632 bgcolor=#fefefe
| 235632 ||  || — || September 8, 2004 || Socorro || LINEAR || V || align=right data-sort-value="0.83" | 830 m || 
|-id=633 bgcolor=#fefefe
| 235633 ||  || — || September 8, 2004 || Socorro || LINEAR || MAS || align=right | 1.0 km || 
|-id=634 bgcolor=#fefefe
| 235634 ||  || — || September 8, 2004 || Socorro || LINEAR || MAS || align=right | 1.0 km || 
|-id=635 bgcolor=#fefefe
| 235635 ||  || — || September 8, 2004 || Socorro || LINEAR || V || align=right data-sort-value="0.91" | 910 m || 
|-id=636 bgcolor=#fefefe
| 235636 ||  || — || September 8, 2004 || Socorro || LINEAR || V || align=right data-sort-value="0.79" | 790 m || 
|-id=637 bgcolor=#fefefe
| 235637 ||  || — || September 8, 2004 || Socorro || LINEAR || V || align=right data-sort-value="0.97" | 970 m || 
|-id=638 bgcolor=#fefefe
| 235638 ||  || — || September 8, 2004 || Socorro || LINEAR || V || align=right data-sort-value="0.93" | 930 m || 
|-id=639 bgcolor=#fefefe
| 235639 ||  || — || September 8, 2004 || Socorro || LINEAR || — || align=right | 1.3 km || 
|-id=640 bgcolor=#E9E9E9
| 235640 ||  || — || September 8, 2004 || Socorro || LINEAR || — || align=right | 1.0 km || 
|-id=641 bgcolor=#fefefe
| 235641 ||  || — || September 8, 2004 || Socorro || LINEAR || V || align=right data-sort-value="0.88" | 880 m || 
|-id=642 bgcolor=#fefefe
| 235642 ||  || — || September 8, 2004 || Socorro || LINEAR || V || align=right | 1.0 km || 
|-id=643 bgcolor=#fefefe
| 235643 ||  || — || September 8, 2004 || Socorro || LINEAR || V || align=right data-sort-value="0.92" | 920 m || 
|-id=644 bgcolor=#fefefe
| 235644 ||  || — || September 8, 2004 || Socorro || LINEAR || — || align=right data-sort-value="0.96" | 960 m || 
|-id=645 bgcolor=#fefefe
| 235645 ||  || — || September 8, 2004 || Palomar || NEAT || — || align=right | 1.3 km || 
|-id=646 bgcolor=#fefefe
| 235646 ||  || — || September 6, 2004 || Palomar || NEAT || FLO || align=right data-sort-value="0.87" | 870 m || 
|-id=647 bgcolor=#fefefe
| 235647 ||  || — || September 7, 2004 || Kitt Peak || Spacewatch || FLO || align=right | 1.3 km || 
|-id=648 bgcolor=#fefefe
| 235648 ||  || — || September 9, 2004 || Socorro || LINEAR || — || align=right | 1.4 km || 
|-id=649 bgcolor=#fefefe
| 235649 ||  || — || September 9, 2004 || Socorro || LINEAR || NYS || align=right | 1.0 km || 
|-id=650 bgcolor=#fefefe
| 235650 ||  || — || September 9, 2004 || Socorro || LINEAR || V || align=right | 1.1 km || 
|-id=651 bgcolor=#fefefe
| 235651 ||  || — || September 9, 2004 || Socorro || LINEAR || — || align=right | 1.1 km || 
|-id=652 bgcolor=#fefefe
| 235652 ||  || — || September 9, 2004 || Socorro || LINEAR || V || align=right | 1.1 km || 
|-id=653 bgcolor=#fefefe
| 235653 ||  || — || September 10, 2004 || Socorro || LINEAR || FLO || align=right data-sort-value="0.80" | 800 m || 
|-id=654 bgcolor=#E9E9E9
| 235654 ||  || — || September 10, 2004 || Socorro || LINEAR || — || align=right | 1.5 km || 
|-id=655 bgcolor=#fefefe
| 235655 ||  || — || September 8, 2004 || Socorro || LINEAR || — || align=right | 1.5 km || 
|-id=656 bgcolor=#fefefe
| 235656 ||  || — || September 9, 2004 || Socorro || LINEAR || V || align=right data-sort-value="0.97" | 970 m || 
|-id=657 bgcolor=#fefefe
| 235657 ||  || — || September 9, 2004 || Socorro || LINEAR || — || align=right | 1.6 km || 
|-id=658 bgcolor=#fefefe
| 235658 ||  || — || September 10, 2004 || Socorro || LINEAR || — || align=right | 1.00 km || 
|-id=659 bgcolor=#fefefe
| 235659 ||  || — || September 10, 2004 || Socorro || LINEAR || — || align=right | 1.4 km || 
|-id=660 bgcolor=#E9E9E9
| 235660 ||  || — || September 10, 2004 || Socorro || LINEAR || — || align=right | 1.3 km || 
|-id=661 bgcolor=#E9E9E9
| 235661 ||  || — || September 11, 2004 || Socorro || LINEAR || — || align=right | 2.2 km || 
|-id=662 bgcolor=#fefefe
| 235662 ||  || — || September 9, 2004 || Kitt Peak || Spacewatch || — || align=right | 1.2 km || 
|-id=663 bgcolor=#fefefe
| 235663 ||  || — || September 9, 2004 || Kitt Peak || Spacewatch || — || align=right | 1.1 km || 
|-id=664 bgcolor=#fefefe
| 235664 ||  || — || September 9, 2004 || Kitt Peak || Spacewatch || NYS || align=right data-sort-value="0.82" | 820 m || 
|-id=665 bgcolor=#fefefe
| 235665 ||  || — || September 9, 2004 || Kitt Peak || Spacewatch || — || align=right data-sort-value="0.91" | 910 m || 
|-id=666 bgcolor=#fefefe
| 235666 ||  || — || September 9, 2004 || Kitt Peak || Spacewatch || — || align=right | 2.1 km || 
|-id=667 bgcolor=#fefefe
| 235667 ||  || — || September 10, 2004 || Kitt Peak || Spacewatch || V || align=right data-sort-value="0.84" | 840 m || 
|-id=668 bgcolor=#fefefe
| 235668 ||  || — || September 10, 2004 || Kitt Peak || Spacewatch || V || align=right data-sort-value="0.69" | 690 m || 
|-id=669 bgcolor=#E9E9E9
| 235669 ||  || — || September 10, 2004 || Kitt Peak || Spacewatch || — || align=right | 1.9 km || 
|-id=670 bgcolor=#fefefe
| 235670 ||  || — || September 13, 2004 || Palomar || NEAT || — || align=right | 2.9 km || 
|-id=671 bgcolor=#E9E9E9
| 235671 ||  || — || September 6, 2004 || Palomar || NEAT || — || align=right | 1.9 km || 
|-id=672 bgcolor=#fefefe
| 235672 ||  || — || September 10, 2004 || Kitt Peak || Spacewatch || — || align=right | 1.2 km || 
|-id=673 bgcolor=#fefefe
| 235673 ||  || — || September 10, 2004 || Kitt Peak || Spacewatch || — || align=right data-sort-value="0.77" | 770 m || 
|-id=674 bgcolor=#fefefe
| 235674 ||  || — || September 15, 2004 || Kitt Peak || Spacewatch || NYS || align=right data-sort-value="0.73" | 730 m || 
|-id=675 bgcolor=#fefefe
| 235675 ||  || — || September 15, 2004 || Kitt Peak || Spacewatch || — || align=right | 1.0 km || 
|-id=676 bgcolor=#E9E9E9
| 235676 ||  || — || September 15, 2004 || 7300 Observatory || W. K. Y. Yeung || — || align=right | 3.5 km || 
|-id=677 bgcolor=#fefefe
| 235677 ||  || — || September 12, 2004 || Socorro || LINEAR || NYS || align=right | 1.0 km || 
|-id=678 bgcolor=#fefefe
| 235678 ||  || — || September 15, 2004 || Kitt Peak || Spacewatch || NYS || align=right data-sort-value="0.95" | 950 m || 
|-id=679 bgcolor=#fefefe
| 235679 ||  || — || September 15, 2004 || Kitt Peak || Spacewatch || NYS || align=right data-sort-value="0.73" | 730 m || 
|-id=680 bgcolor=#fefefe
| 235680 ||  || — || September 8, 2004 || Bergisch Gladbac || W. Bickel || NYS || align=right data-sort-value="0.91" | 910 m || 
|-id=681 bgcolor=#fefefe
| 235681 ||  || — || September 15, 2004 || Anderson Mesa || LONEOS || V || align=right data-sort-value="0.94" | 940 m || 
|-id=682 bgcolor=#fefefe
| 235682 ||  || — || September 15, 2004 || Anderson Mesa || LONEOS || — || align=right | 1.1 km || 
|-id=683 bgcolor=#E9E9E9
| 235683 ||  || — || September 15, 2004 || Kitt Peak || Spacewatch || — || align=right | 1.00 km || 
|-id=684 bgcolor=#E9E9E9
| 235684 ||  || — || September 15, 2004 || Kitt Peak || Spacewatch || — || align=right | 1.2 km || 
|-id=685 bgcolor=#fefefe
| 235685 ||  || — || September 17, 2004 || Socorro || LINEAR || — || align=right | 1.5 km || 
|-id=686 bgcolor=#fefefe
| 235686 ||  || — || September 17, 2004 || Anderson Mesa || LONEOS || FLO || align=right data-sort-value="0.79" | 790 m || 
|-id=687 bgcolor=#fefefe
| 235687 ||  || — || September 17, 2004 || Anderson Mesa || LONEOS || — || align=right | 1.2 km || 
|-id=688 bgcolor=#E9E9E9
| 235688 ||  || — || September 17, 2004 || Anderson Mesa || LONEOS || — || align=right | 3.0 km || 
|-id=689 bgcolor=#E9E9E9
| 235689 ||  || — || September 17, 2004 || Desert Eagle || W. K. Y. Yeung || — || align=right | 5.0 km || 
|-id=690 bgcolor=#fefefe
| 235690 ||  || — || September 17, 2004 || Anderson Mesa || LONEOS || V || align=right | 1.1 km || 
|-id=691 bgcolor=#fefefe
| 235691 ||  || — || September 17, 2004 || Kitt Peak || Spacewatch || MAS || align=right | 1.0 km || 
|-id=692 bgcolor=#E9E9E9
| 235692 ||  || — || September 20, 2004 || Goodricke-Pigott || R. A. Tucker || — || align=right | 1.7 km || 
|-id=693 bgcolor=#fefefe
| 235693 ||  || — || September 17, 2004 || Socorro || LINEAR || V || align=right | 1.1 km || 
|-id=694 bgcolor=#fefefe
| 235694 ||  || — || September 17, 2004 || Socorro || LINEAR || V || align=right | 1.2 km || 
|-id=695 bgcolor=#fefefe
| 235695 ||  || — || September 17, 2004 || Socorro || LINEAR || NYS || align=right | 1.0 km || 
|-id=696 bgcolor=#E9E9E9
| 235696 ||  || — || September 17, 2004 || Socorro || LINEAR || — || align=right | 1.4 km || 
|-id=697 bgcolor=#fefefe
| 235697 ||  || — || September 17, 2004 || Socorro || LINEAR || NYS || align=right data-sort-value="0.93" | 930 m || 
|-id=698 bgcolor=#E9E9E9
| 235698 ||  || — || October 4, 2004 || Kitt Peak || Spacewatch || — || align=right | 3.2 km || 
|-id=699 bgcolor=#fefefe
| 235699 ||  || — || October 5, 2004 || Kitt Peak || Spacewatch || — || align=right | 1.1 km || 
|-id=700 bgcolor=#FFC2E0
| 235700 ||  || — || October 10, 2004 || Haleakala || NEAT || APOcritical || align=right data-sort-value="0.71" | 710 m || 
|}

235701–235800 

|-bgcolor=#fefefe
| 235701 ||  || — || October 4, 2004 || Kitt Peak || Spacewatch || — || align=right | 1.1 km || 
|-id=702 bgcolor=#E9E9E9
| 235702 ||  || — || October 4, 2004 || Kitt Peak || Spacewatch || — || align=right | 1.2 km || 
|-id=703 bgcolor=#E9E9E9
| 235703 ||  || — || October 4, 2004 || Kitt Peak || Spacewatch || — || align=right data-sort-value="0.90" | 900 m || 
|-id=704 bgcolor=#E9E9E9
| 235704 ||  || — || October 4, 2004 || Kitt Peak || Spacewatch || — || align=right | 1.8 km || 
|-id=705 bgcolor=#E9E9E9
| 235705 ||  || — || October 4, 2004 || Kitt Peak || Spacewatch || — || align=right | 4.2 km || 
|-id=706 bgcolor=#E9E9E9
| 235706 ||  || — || October 4, 2004 || Kitt Peak || Spacewatch || — || align=right | 1.1 km || 
|-id=707 bgcolor=#fefefe
| 235707 ||  || — || October 4, 2004 || Kitt Peak || Spacewatch || FLO || align=right | 1.0 km || 
|-id=708 bgcolor=#E9E9E9
| 235708 ||  || — || October 4, 2004 || Kitt Peak || Spacewatch || — || align=right | 2.0 km || 
|-id=709 bgcolor=#E9E9E9
| 235709 ||  || — || October 5, 2004 || Kitt Peak || Spacewatch || — || align=right | 2.7 km || 
|-id=710 bgcolor=#fefefe
| 235710 ||  || — || October 5, 2004 || Anderson Mesa || LONEOS || — || align=right | 1.3 km || 
|-id=711 bgcolor=#fefefe
| 235711 ||  || — || October 5, 2004 || Anderson Mesa || LONEOS || — || align=right | 1.5 km || 
|-id=712 bgcolor=#E9E9E9
| 235712 ||  || — || October 5, 2004 || Kitt Peak || Spacewatch || PAD || align=right | 3.1 km || 
|-id=713 bgcolor=#E9E9E9
| 235713 ||  || — || October 6, 2004 || Palomar || NEAT || — || align=right | 2.4 km || 
|-id=714 bgcolor=#E9E9E9
| 235714 ||  || — || October 7, 2004 || Palomar || NEAT || — || align=right | 5.7 km || 
|-id=715 bgcolor=#fefefe
| 235715 ||  || — || October 7, 2004 || Anderson Mesa || LONEOS || — || align=right | 1.4 km || 
|-id=716 bgcolor=#fefefe
| 235716 ||  || — || October 7, 2004 || Socorro || LINEAR || V || align=right data-sort-value="0.97" | 970 m || 
|-id=717 bgcolor=#fefefe
| 235717 ||  || — || October 7, 2004 || Socorro || LINEAR || — || align=right data-sort-value="0.88" | 880 m || 
|-id=718 bgcolor=#E9E9E9
| 235718 ||  || — || October 7, 2004 || Socorro || LINEAR || — || align=right | 2.5 km || 
|-id=719 bgcolor=#fefefe
| 235719 ||  || — || October 4, 2004 || Kitt Peak || Spacewatch || CLA || align=right | 2.6 km || 
|-id=720 bgcolor=#E9E9E9
| 235720 ||  || — || October 6, 2004 || Kitt Peak || Spacewatch || — || align=right | 1.5 km || 
|-id=721 bgcolor=#E9E9E9
| 235721 ||  || — || October 6, 2004 || Kitt Peak || Spacewatch || — || align=right | 2.2 km || 
|-id=722 bgcolor=#E9E9E9
| 235722 ||  || — || October 6, 2004 || Kitt Peak || Spacewatch || — || align=right | 1.7 km || 
|-id=723 bgcolor=#fefefe
| 235723 ||  || — || October 7, 2004 || Socorro || LINEAR || NYS || align=right | 1.2 km || 
|-id=724 bgcolor=#fefefe
| 235724 ||  || — || October 7, 2004 || Socorro || LINEAR || NYS || align=right | 1.1 km || 
|-id=725 bgcolor=#fefefe
| 235725 ||  || — || October 7, 2004 || Socorro || LINEAR || — || align=right | 1.6 km || 
|-id=726 bgcolor=#E9E9E9
| 235726 ||  || — || October 8, 2004 || Socorro || LINEAR || — || align=right | 1.6 km || 
|-id=727 bgcolor=#fefefe
| 235727 ||  || — || October 9, 2004 || Socorro || LINEAR || — || align=right | 1.2 km || 
|-id=728 bgcolor=#E9E9E9
| 235728 ||  || — || October 7, 2004 || Kitt Peak || Spacewatch || — || align=right | 1.00 km || 
|-id=729 bgcolor=#fefefe
| 235729 ||  || — || October 7, 2004 || Kitt Peak || Spacewatch || — || align=right | 2.9 km || 
|-id=730 bgcolor=#E9E9E9
| 235730 ||  || — || October 7, 2004 || Kitt Peak || Spacewatch || — || align=right | 1.3 km || 
|-id=731 bgcolor=#fefefe
| 235731 ||  || — || October 6, 2004 || Socorro || LINEAR || — || align=right | 1.3 km || 
|-id=732 bgcolor=#fefefe
| 235732 ||  || — || October 8, 2004 || Kitt Peak || Spacewatch || — || align=right data-sort-value="0.95" | 950 m || 
|-id=733 bgcolor=#fefefe
| 235733 ||  || — || October 9, 2004 || Socorro || LINEAR || — || align=right | 1.4 km || 
|-id=734 bgcolor=#fefefe
| 235734 ||  || — || October 7, 2004 || Kitt Peak || Spacewatch || V || align=right | 1.2 km || 
|-id=735 bgcolor=#E9E9E9
| 235735 ||  || — || October 7, 2004 || Kitt Peak || Spacewatch || — || align=right | 1.1 km || 
|-id=736 bgcolor=#E9E9E9
| 235736 ||  || — || October 8, 2004 || Palomar || NEAT || — || align=right | 3.8 km || 
|-id=737 bgcolor=#fefefe
| 235737 ||  || — || October 9, 2004 || Kitt Peak || Spacewatch || MAS || align=right data-sort-value="0.96" | 960 m || 
|-id=738 bgcolor=#E9E9E9
| 235738 ||  || — || October 9, 2004 || Kitt Peak || Spacewatch || — || align=right | 1.1 km || 
|-id=739 bgcolor=#fefefe
| 235739 ||  || — || October 9, 2004 || Kitt Peak || Spacewatch || — || align=right | 1.1 km || 
|-id=740 bgcolor=#fefefe
| 235740 ||  || — || October 8, 2004 || Kitt Peak || Spacewatch || V || align=right data-sort-value="0.99" | 990 m || 
|-id=741 bgcolor=#E9E9E9
| 235741 ||  || — || October 8, 2004 || Kitt Peak || Spacewatch || — || align=right | 1.1 km || 
|-id=742 bgcolor=#E9E9E9
| 235742 ||  || — || October 11, 2004 || Palomar || NEAT || RAF || align=right | 1.4 km || 
|-id=743 bgcolor=#fefefe
| 235743 ||  || — || October 10, 2004 || Kitt Peak || Spacewatch || NYS || align=right | 1.8 km || 
|-id=744 bgcolor=#E9E9E9
| 235744 ||  || — || October 10, 2004 || Socorro || LINEAR || — || align=right | 3.5 km || 
|-id=745 bgcolor=#E9E9E9
| 235745 ||  || — || October 10, 2004 || Kitt Peak || Spacewatch || NEM || align=right | 2.6 km || 
|-id=746 bgcolor=#fefefe
| 235746 ||  || — || October 11, 2004 || Kitt Peak || Spacewatch || V || align=right | 1.1 km || 
|-id=747 bgcolor=#E9E9E9
| 235747 ||  || — || October 9, 2004 || Kitt Peak || Spacewatch || — || align=right | 1.0 km || 
|-id=748 bgcolor=#E9E9E9
| 235748 ||  || — || October 13, 2004 || Anderson Mesa || LONEOS || — || align=right | 2.2 km || 
|-id=749 bgcolor=#fefefe
| 235749 ||  || — || October 7, 2004 || Kitt Peak || Spacewatch || MAS || align=right | 1.1 km || 
|-id=750 bgcolor=#E9E9E9
| 235750 ||  || — || October 11, 2004 || Kitt Peak || M. W. Buie || — || align=right | 1.4 km || 
|-id=751 bgcolor=#fefefe
| 235751 ||  || — || October 15, 2004 || Kitt Peak || Spacewatch || — || align=right | 1.7 km || 
|-id=752 bgcolor=#fefefe
| 235752 ||  || — || October 4, 2004 || Kitt Peak || Spacewatch || — || align=right | 2.4 km || 
|-id=753 bgcolor=#E9E9E9
| 235753 ||  || — || October 18, 2004 || Socorro || LINEAR || JUN || align=right | 1.2 km || 
|-id=754 bgcolor=#E9E9E9
| 235754 ||  || — || October 19, 2004 || Socorro || LINEAR || — || align=right | 1.4 km || 
|-id=755 bgcolor=#E9E9E9
| 235755 ||  || — || October 21, 2004 || Socorro || LINEAR || — || align=right | 3.2 km || 
|-id=756 bgcolor=#FFC2E0
| 235756 ||  || — || November 1, 2004 || Siding Spring || SSS || APOPHA || align=right | 1.1 km || 
|-id=757 bgcolor=#E9E9E9
| 235757 ||  || — || November 3, 2004 || Kitt Peak || Spacewatch || — || align=right | 1.0 km || 
|-id=758 bgcolor=#E9E9E9
| 235758 ||  || — || November 3, 2004 || Kitt Peak || Spacewatch || — || align=right | 4.1 km || 
|-id=759 bgcolor=#fefefe
| 235759 ||  || — || November 3, 2004 || Kitt Peak || Spacewatch || — || align=right | 1.2 km || 
|-id=760 bgcolor=#E9E9E9
| 235760 ||  || — || November 3, 2004 || Anderson Mesa || LONEOS || — || align=right | 1.6 km || 
|-id=761 bgcolor=#E9E9E9
| 235761 ||  || — || November 3, 2004 || Kitt Peak || Spacewatch || — || align=right | 2.4 km || 
|-id=762 bgcolor=#E9E9E9
| 235762 ||  || — || November 3, 2004 || Kitt Peak || Spacewatch || MIS || align=right | 3.2 km || 
|-id=763 bgcolor=#E9E9E9
| 235763 ||  || — || November 3, 2004 || Anderson Mesa || LONEOS || — || align=right | 1.3 km || 
|-id=764 bgcolor=#E9E9E9
| 235764 ||  || — || November 3, 2004 || Palomar || NEAT || — || align=right | 1.1 km || 
|-id=765 bgcolor=#E9E9E9
| 235765 ||  || — || November 3, 2004 || Catalina || CSS || BRG || align=right | 1.9 km || 
|-id=766 bgcolor=#E9E9E9
| 235766 ||  || — || November 1, 2004 || Palomar || NEAT || — || align=right | 2.7 km || 
|-id=767 bgcolor=#E9E9E9
| 235767 ||  || — || November 3, 2004 || Kitt Peak || Spacewatch || — || align=right | 1.4 km || 
|-id=768 bgcolor=#fefefe
| 235768 ||  || — || November 4, 2004 || Catalina || CSS || — || align=right | 1.3 km || 
|-id=769 bgcolor=#E9E9E9
| 235769 ||  || — || November 4, 2004 || Catalina || CSS || — || align=right | 3.2 km || 
|-id=770 bgcolor=#E9E9E9
| 235770 ||  || — || November 4, 2004 || Catalina || CSS || — || align=right | 1.8 km || 
|-id=771 bgcolor=#E9E9E9
| 235771 ||  || — || November 5, 2004 || Campo Imperatore || CINEOS || — || align=right | 2.2 km || 
|-id=772 bgcolor=#E9E9E9
| 235772 ||  || — || November 4, 2004 || Anderson Mesa || LONEOS || — || align=right | 1.4 km || 
|-id=773 bgcolor=#E9E9E9
| 235773 ||  || — || November 5, 2004 || Anderson Mesa || LONEOS || RAF || align=right | 1.6 km || 
|-id=774 bgcolor=#E9E9E9
| 235774 ||  || — || November 3, 2004 || Kitt Peak || Spacewatch || — || align=right | 1.1 km || 
|-id=775 bgcolor=#fefefe
| 235775 ||  || — || November 3, 2004 || Kitt Peak || Spacewatch || NYS || align=right data-sort-value="0.84" | 840 m || 
|-id=776 bgcolor=#E9E9E9
| 235776 ||  || — || November 4, 2004 || Kitt Peak || Spacewatch || — || align=right | 3.0 km || 
|-id=777 bgcolor=#E9E9E9
| 235777 ||  || — || November 4, 2004 || Kitt Peak || Spacewatch || — || align=right | 1.2 km || 
|-id=778 bgcolor=#E9E9E9
| 235778 ||  || — || November 12, 2004 || Catalina || CSS || — || align=right | 3.1 km || 
|-id=779 bgcolor=#FA8072
| 235779 ||  || — || November 4, 2004 || Socorro || LINEAR || — || align=right | 1.3 km || 
|-id=780 bgcolor=#E9E9E9
| 235780 ||  || — || November 10, 2004 || Kitt Peak || Spacewatch || — || align=right | 1.5 km || 
|-id=781 bgcolor=#E9E9E9
| 235781 ||  || — || November 11, 2004 || Kitt Peak || Spacewatch || — || align=right | 1.6 km || 
|-id=782 bgcolor=#E9E9E9
| 235782 ||  || — || November 19, 2004 || Socorro || LINEAR || GER || align=right | 3.1 km || 
|-id=783 bgcolor=#E9E9E9
| 235783 ||  || — || November 19, 2004 || Catalina || CSS || — || align=right | 1.8 km || 
|-id=784 bgcolor=#E9E9E9
| 235784 ||  || — || November 30, 2004 || Palomar || NEAT || — || align=right | 3.7 km || 
|-id=785 bgcolor=#E9E9E9
| 235785 ||  || — || November 19, 2004 || Kitt Peak || Spacewatch || — || align=right | 1.9 km || 
|-id=786 bgcolor=#E9E9E9
| 235786 ||  || — || December 1, 2004 || Catalina || CSS || GEF || align=right | 1.7 km || 
|-id=787 bgcolor=#E9E9E9
| 235787 ||  || — || December 2, 2004 || Catalina || CSS || CLO || align=right | 3.3 km || 
|-id=788 bgcolor=#E9E9E9
| 235788 ||  || — || December 2, 2004 || Kitt Peak || Spacewatch || — || align=right | 3.7 km || 
|-id=789 bgcolor=#fefefe
| 235789 ||  || — || December 2, 2004 || Catalina || CSS || — || align=right | 1.7 km || 
|-id=790 bgcolor=#E9E9E9
| 235790 ||  || — || December 7, 2004 || Socorro || LINEAR || JUN || align=right | 1.3 km || 
|-id=791 bgcolor=#d6d6d6
| 235791 ||  || — || December 8, 2004 || Socorro || LINEAR || — || align=right | 4.2 km || 
|-id=792 bgcolor=#E9E9E9
| 235792 ||  || — || December 8, 2004 || Socorro || LINEAR || — || align=right | 2.4 km || 
|-id=793 bgcolor=#E9E9E9
| 235793 ||  || — || December 9, 2004 || Catalina || CSS || MRX || align=right | 1.4 km || 
|-id=794 bgcolor=#E9E9E9
| 235794 ||  || — || December 9, 2004 || Kitt Peak || Spacewatch || GEF || align=right | 1.5 km || 
|-id=795 bgcolor=#E9E9E9
| 235795 ||  || — || December 8, 2004 || Socorro || LINEAR || — || align=right | 1.7 km || 
|-id=796 bgcolor=#E9E9E9
| 235796 ||  || — || December 8, 2004 || Socorro || LINEAR || EUN || align=right | 2.0 km || 
|-id=797 bgcolor=#E9E9E9
| 235797 ||  || — || December 8, 2004 || Socorro || LINEAR || HEN || align=right | 1.3 km || 
|-id=798 bgcolor=#E9E9E9
| 235798 ||  || — || December 8, 2004 || Socorro || LINEAR || — || align=right | 2.6 km || 
|-id=799 bgcolor=#E9E9E9
| 235799 ||  || — || December 8, 2004 || Socorro || LINEAR || — || align=right | 4.5 km || 
|-id=800 bgcolor=#E9E9E9
| 235800 ||  || — || December 9, 2004 || Kitt Peak || Spacewatch || — || align=right | 2.4 km || 
|}

235801–235900 

|-bgcolor=#E9E9E9
| 235801 ||  || — || December 9, 2004 || Catalina || CSS || DOR || align=right | 3.7 km || 
|-id=802 bgcolor=#fefefe
| 235802 ||  || — || December 11, 2004 || Campo Imperatore || CINEOS || — || align=right | 3.7 km || 
|-id=803 bgcolor=#E9E9E9
| 235803 ||  || — || December 7, 2004 || Socorro || LINEAR || EUN || align=right | 1.5 km || 
|-id=804 bgcolor=#E9E9E9
| 235804 ||  || — || December 10, 2004 || Socorro || LINEAR || — || align=right | 1.3 km || 
|-id=805 bgcolor=#d6d6d6
| 235805 ||  || — || December 10, 2004 || Socorro || LINEAR || — || align=right | 3.9 km || 
|-id=806 bgcolor=#E9E9E9
| 235806 ||  || — || December 2, 2004 || Catalina || CSS || — || align=right | 1.9 km || 
|-id=807 bgcolor=#E9E9E9
| 235807 ||  || — || December 9, 2004 || Kitt Peak || Spacewatch || — || align=right | 1.5 km || 
|-id=808 bgcolor=#E9E9E9
| 235808 ||  || — || December 10, 2004 || Kitt Peak || Spacewatch || — || align=right | 2.0 km || 
|-id=809 bgcolor=#E9E9E9
| 235809 ||  || — || December 10, 2004 || Kitt Peak || Spacewatch || MRX || align=right | 1.1 km || 
|-id=810 bgcolor=#E9E9E9
| 235810 ||  || — || December 10, 2004 || Kitt Peak || Spacewatch || NEM || align=right | 3.0 km || 
|-id=811 bgcolor=#E9E9E9
| 235811 ||  || — || December 10, 2004 || Kitt Peak || Spacewatch || — || align=right | 3.8 km || 
|-id=812 bgcolor=#E9E9E9
| 235812 ||  || — || December 12, 2004 || Kitt Peak || Spacewatch || — || align=right | 2.5 km || 
|-id=813 bgcolor=#E9E9E9
| 235813 ||  || — || December 2, 2004 || Kitt Peak || Spacewatch || — || align=right | 1.5 km || 
|-id=814 bgcolor=#E9E9E9
| 235814 ||  || — || December 10, 2004 || Kitt Peak || Spacewatch || — || align=right | 2.0 km || 
|-id=815 bgcolor=#E9E9E9
| 235815 ||  || — || December 11, 2004 || Kitt Peak || Spacewatch || — || align=right | 1.9 km || 
|-id=816 bgcolor=#E9E9E9
| 235816 ||  || — || December 12, 2004 || Kitt Peak || Spacewatch || XIZ || align=right | 1.9 km || 
|-id=817 bgcolor=#d6d6d6
| 235817 ||  || — || December 13, 2004 || Kitt Peak || Spacewatch || — || align=right | 4.9 km || 
|-id=818 bgcolor=#E9E9E9
| 235818 ||  || — || December 10, 2004 || Campo Imperatore || CINEOS || KON || align=right | 4.0 km || 
|-id=819 bgcolor=#E9E9E9
| 235819 ||  || — || December 11, 2004 || Kitt Peak || Spacewatch || MIS || align=right | 2.5 km || 
|-id=820 bgcolor=#E9E9E9
| 235820 ||  || — || December 11, 2004 || Socorro || LINEAR || — || align=right | 2.7 km || 
|-id=821 bgcolor=#d6d6d6
| 235821 ||  || — || December 11, 2004 || Kitt Peak || Spacewatch || — || align=right | 5.8 km || 
|-id=822 bgcolor=#E9E9E9
| 235822 ||  || — || December 11, 2004 || Catalina || CSS || — || align=right | 3.6 km || 
|-id=823 bgcolor=#E9E9E9
| 235823 ||  || — || December 14, 2004 || Catalina || CSS || — || align=right | 1.7 km || 
|-id=824 bgcolor=#E9E9E9
| 235824 ||  || — || December 10, 2004 || Socorro || LINEAR || — || align=right | 4.0 km || 
|-id=825 bgcolor=#E9E9E9
| 235825 ||  || — || December 14, 2004 || Socorro || LINEAR || — || align=right | 1.3 km || 
|-id=826 bgcolor=#E9E9E9
| 235826 ||  || — || December 14, 2004 || Catalina || CSS || HNS || align=right | 2.1 km || 
|-id=827 bgcolor=#E9E9E9
| 235827 ||  || — || December 15, 2004 || Socorro || LINEAR || — || align=right | 2.8 km || 
|-id=828 bgcolor=#E9E9E9
| 235828 ||  || — || December 14, 2004 || Kitt Peak || Spacewatch || — || align=right | 1.7 km || 
|-id=829 bgcolor=#E9E9E9
| 235829 ||  || — || December 12, 2004 || Socorro || LINEAR || — || align=right | 2.9 km || 
|-id=830 bgcolor=#E9E9E9
| 235830 ||  || — || December 15, 2004 || Kitt Peak || Spacewatch || — || align=right | 1.6 km || 
|-id=831 bgcolor=#E9E9E9
| 235831 ||  || — || December 14, 2004 || Kitt Peak || Spacewatch || — || align=right | 3.0 km || 
|-id=832 bgcolor=#d6d6d6
| 235832 ||  || — || December 15, 2004 || Kitt Peak || Spacewatch || VER || align=right | 5.0 km || 
|-id=833 bgcolor=#E9E9E9
| 235833 ||  || — || December 1, 2004 || Socorro || LINEAR || — || align=right | 2.8 km || 
|-id=834 bgcolor=#E9E9E9
| 235834 ||  || — || December 1, 2004 || Palomar || NEAT || — || align=right | 2.0 km || 
|-id=835 bgcolor=#E9E9E9
| 235835 ||  || — || December 10, 2004 || Kitt Peak || Spacewatch || — || align=right | 1.5 km || 
|-id=836 bgcolor=#E9E9E9
| 235836 ||  || — || December 11, 2004 || Kitt Peak || Spacewatch || AER || align=right | 2.2 km || 
|-id=837 bgcolor=#E9E9E9
| 235837 Iota ||  ||  || December 19, 2004 || Needville || J. Dellinger || — || align=right | 4.9 km || 
|-id=838 bgcolor=#E9E9E9
| 235838 ||  || — || December 16, 2004 || Kitt Peak || Spacewatch || — || align=right | 2.1 km || 
|-id=839 bgcolor=#E9E9E9
| 235839 ||  || — || December 18, 2004 || Mount Lemmon || Mount Lemmon Survey || — || align=right | 1.7 km || 
|-id=840 bgcolor=#d6d6d6
| 235840 ||  || — || December 18, 2004 || Mount Lemmon || Mount Lemmon Survey || — || align=right | 2.8 km || 
|-id=841 bgcolor=#E9E9E9
| 235841 ||  || — || December 18, 2004 || Mount Lemmon || Mount Lemmon Survey || NEM || align=right | 2.7 km || 
|-id=842 bgcolor=#d6d6d6
| 235842 ||  || — || December 18, 2004 || Mount Lemmon || Mount Lemmon Survey || — || align=right | 6.1 km || 
|-id=843 bgcolor=#E9E9E9
| 235843 ||  || — || December 19, 2004 || Mount Lemmon || Mount Lemmon Survey || HEN || align=right | 1.3 km || 
|-id=844 bgcolor=#E9E9E9
| 235844 ||  || — || December 20, 2004 || Mount Lemmon || Mount Lemmon Survey || — || align=right | 2.7 km || 
|-id=845 bgcolor=#E9E9E9
| 235845 ||  || — || January 1, 2005 || Catalina || CSS || INO || align=right | 1.8 km || 
|-id=846 bgcolor=#E9E9E9
| 235846 ||  || — || January 6, 2005 || Catalina || CSS || — || align=right | 3.8 km || 
|-id=847 bgcolor=#E9E9E9
| 235847 ||  || — || January 6, 2005 || Catalina || CSS || — || align=right | 2.5 km || 
|-id=848 bgcolor=#E9E9E9
| 235848 ||  || — || January 6, 2005 || Catalina || CSS || — || align=right | 3.1 km || 
|-id=849 bgcolor=#E9E9E9
| 235849 ||  || — || January 7, 2005 || Socorro || LINEAR || — || align=right | 2.2 km || 
|-id=850 bgcolor=#d6d6d6
| 235850 ||  || — || January 6, 2005 || Socorro || LINEAR || — || align=right | 3.0 km || 
|-id=851 bgcolor=#E9E9E9
| 235851 ||  || — || January 8, 2005 || Campo Imperatore || CINEOS || — || align=right | 1.8 km || 
|-id=852 bgcolor=#E9E9E9
| 235852 Theogeuens ||  ||  || January 14, 2005 || Uccle || E. W. Elst, T. Pauwels || NEM || align=right | 2.6 km || 
|-id=853 bgcolor=#E9E9E9
| 235853 ||  || — || January 13, 2005 || Catalina || CSS || — || align=right | 4.0 km || 
|-id=854 bgcolor=#E9E9E9
| 235854 ||  || — || January 8, 2005 || Socorro || LINEAR || — || align=right | 3.6 km || 
|-id=855 bgcolor=#E9E9E9
| 235855 ||  || — || January 9, 2005 || Catalina || CSS || — || align=right | 4.0 km || 
|-id=856 bgcolor=#d6d6d6
| 235856 ||  || — || January 13, 2005 || Kitt Peak || Spacewatch || — || align=right | 5.2 km || 
|-id=857 bgcolor=#E9E9E9
| 235857 ||  || — || January 13, 2005 || Socorro || LINEAR || — || align=right | 2.4 km || 
|-id=858 bgcolor=#E9E9E9
| 235858 ||  || — || January 13, 2005 || Kitt Peak || Spacewatch || — || align=right | 2.6 km || 
|-id=859 bgcolor=#E9E9E9
| 235859 ||  || — || January 13, 2005 || Kitt Peak || Spacewatch || MRX || align=right | 1.6 km || 
|-id=860 bgcolor=#E9E9E9
| 235860 ||  || — || January 15, 2005 || Catalina || CSS || ADE || align=right | 4.2 km || 
|-id=861 bgcolor=#E9E9E9
| 235861 ||  || — || January 15, 2005 || Socorro || LINEAR || — || align=right | 2.2 km || 
|-id=862 bgcolor=#E9E9E9
| 235862 ||  || — || January 15, 2005 || Kitt Peak || Spacewatch || GEF || align=right | 1.8 km || 
|-id=863 bgcolor=#d6d6d6
| 235863 ||  || — || January 13, 2005 || Kitt Peak || Spacewatch || — || align=right | 6.5 km || 
|-id=864 bgcolor=#E9E9E9
| 235864 ||  || — || January 15, 2005 || Catalina || CSS || — || align=right | 3.4 km || 
|-id=865 bgcolor=#E9E9E9
| 235865 ||  || — || January 15, 2005 || Socorro || LINEAR || — || align=right | 2.7 km || 
|-id=866 bgcolor=#E9E9E9
| 235866 ||  || — || January 15, 2005 || Kitt Peak || Spacewatch || ADE || align=right | 4.1 km || 
|-id=867 bgcolor=#d6d6d6
| 235867 ||  || — || January 15, 2005 || Kitt Peak || Spacewatch || — || align=right | 4.9 km || 
|-id=868 bgcolor=#d6d6d6
| 235868 ||  || — || January 15, 2005 || Kitt Peak || Spacewatch || HYG || align=right | 4.8 km || 
|-id=869 bgcolor=#E9E9E9
| 235869 ||  || — || January 13, 2005 || Kitt Peak || Spacewatch || — || align=right | 2.5 km || 
|-id=870 bgcolor=#E9E9E9
| 235870 ||  || — || January 16, 2005 || Socorro || LINEAR || — || align=right | 3.0 km || 
|-id=871 bgcolor=#E9E9E9
| 235871 ||  || — || January 16, 2005 || Socorro || LINEAR || — || align=right | 3.1 km || 
|-id=872 bgcolor=#E9E9E9
| 235872 ||  || — || January 16, 2005 || Kitt Peak || Spacewatch || — || align=right | 3.5 km || 
|-id=873 bgcolor=#E9E9E9
| 235873 ||  || — || January 17, 2005 || Socorro || LINEAR || DOR || align=right | 3.3 km || 
|-id=874 bgcolor=#E9E9E9
| 235874 ||  || — || January 16, 2005 || Kitt Peak || Spacewatch || HNA || align=right | 4.1 km || 
|-id=875 bgcolor=#E9E9E9
| 235875 ||  || — || January 16, 2005 || Socorro || LINEAR || — || align=right | 3.4 km || 
|-id=876 bgcolor=#d6d6d6
| 235876 ||  || — || January 18, 2005 || Catalina || CSS || — || align=right | 6.8 km || 
|-id=877 bgcolor=#E9E9E9
| 235877 ||  || — || January 19, 2005 || Kitt Peak || Spacewatch || HEN || align=right | 1.6 km || 
|-id=878 bgcolor=#d6d6d6
| 235878 ||  || — || January 31, 2005 || Socorro || LINEAR || — || align=right | 4.7 km || 
|-id=879 bgcolor=#d6d6d6
| 235879 ||  || — || January 16, 2005 || Mauna Kea || C. Veillet || — || align=right | 3.6 km || 
|-id=880 bgcolor=#E9E9E9
| 235880 ||  || — || January 19, 2005 || Kitt Peak || Spacewatch || — || align=right | 3.3 km || 
|-id=881 bgcolor=#E9E9E9
| 235881 ||  || — || February 1, 2005 || Catalina || CSS || — || align=right | 3.0 km || 
|-id=882 bgcolor=#E9E9E9
| 235882 ||  || — || February 1, 2005 || Kitt Peak || Spacewatch || — || align=right | 2.4 km || 
|-id=883 bgcolor=#E9E9E9
| 235883 ||  || — || February 1, 2005 || Catalina || CSS || HNA || align=right | 3.5 km || 
|-id=884 bgcolor=#d6d6d6
| 235884 ||  || — || February 1, 2005 || Catalina || CSS || — || align=right | 3.7 km || 
|-id=885 bgcolor=#E9E9E9
| 235885 ||  || — || February 1, 2005 || Kitt Peak || Spacewatch || — || align=right | 3.8 km || 
|-id=886 bgcolor=#d6d6d6
| 235886 ||  || — || February 2, 2005 || Socorro || LINEAR || — || align=right | 9.0 km || 
|-id=887 bgcolor=#E9E9E9
| 235887 ||  || — || February 1, 2005 || Kitt Peak || Spacewatch || HOF || align=right | 5.6 km || 
|-id=888 bgcolor=#E9E9E9
| 235888 ||  || — || February 3, 2005 || Socorro || LINEAR || — || align=right | 1.8 km || 
|-id=889 bgcolor=#E9E9E9
| 235889 ||  || — || February 2, 2005 || Catalina || CSS || — || align=right | 2.6 km || 
|-id=890 bgcolor=#E9E9E9
| 235890 ||  || — || February 2, 2005 || Catalina || CSS || — || align=right | 3.4 km || 
|-id=891 bgcolor=#E9E9E9
| 235891 ||  || — || February 2, 2005 || Catalina || CSS || — || align=right | 2.6 km || 
|-id=892 bgcolor=#d6d6d6
| 235892 ||  || — || February 2, 2005 || Catalina || CSS || — || align=right | 4.9 km || 
|-id=893 bgcolor=#d6d6d6
| 235893 ||  || — || February 2, 2005 || Palomar || NEAT || — || align=right | 4.1 km || 
|-id=894 bgcolor=#d6d6d6
| 235894 ||  || — || February 14, 2005 || Mayhill || A. Lowe || — || align=right | 4.7 km || 
|-id=895 bgcolor=#E9E9E9
| 235895 ||  || — || February 9, 2005 || Anderson Mesa || LONEOS || HNA || align=right | 2.9 km || 
|-id=896 bgcolor=#d6d6d6
| 235896 ||  || — || February 9, 2005 || Anderson Mesa || LONEOS || — || align=right | 4.5 km || 
|-id=897 bgcolor=#E9E9E9
| 235897 ||  || — || February 4, 2005 || Anderson Mesa || LONEOS || HNA || align=right | 3.5 km || 
|-id=898 bgcolor=#E9E9E9
| 235898 ||  || — || February 14, 2005 || Kitt Peak || Spacewatch || HOF || align=right | 4.0 km || 
|-id=899 bgcolor=#d6d6d6
| 235899 ||  || — || February 1, 2005 || Kitt Peak || Spacewatch || KOR || align=right | 1.4 km || 
|-id=900 bgcolor=#E9E9E9
| 235900 ||  || — || February 2, 2005 || Catalina || CSS || DOR || align=right | 3.4 km || 
|}

235901–236000 

|-bgcolor=#E9E9E9
| 235901 ||  || — || February 1, 2005 || Catalina || CSS || — || align=right | 2.4 km || 
|-id=902 bgcolor=#d6d6d6
| 235902 || 2005 DC || — || February 16, 2005 || Sandlot || G. Hug || TIR || align=right | 2.4 km || 
|-id=903 bgcolor=#d6d6d6
| 235903 ||  || — || March 1, 2005 || Socorro || LINEAR || — || align=right | 5.6 km || 
|-id=904 bgcolor=#E9E9E9
| 235904 ||  || — || March 1, 2005 || Kitt Peak || Spacewatch || — || align=right | 2.8 km || 
|-id=905 bgcolor=#d6d6d6
| 235905 ||  || — || March 2, 2005 || Kitt Peak || Spacewatch || — || align=right | 3.1 km || 
|-id=906 bgcolor=#d6d6d6
| 235906 ||  || — || March 3, 2005 || Kitt Peak || Spacewatch || — || align=right | 3.6 km || 
|-id=907 bgcolor=#d6d6d6
| 235907 ||  || — || March 3, 2005 || Kitt Peak || Spacewatch || — || align=right | 2.2 km || 
|-id=908 bgcolor=#d6d6d6
| 235908 ||  || — || March 3, 2005 || Catalina || CSS || — || align=right | 4.0 km || 
|-id=909 bgcolor=#d6d6d6
| 235909 ||  || — || March 3, 2005 || Catalina || CSS || — || align=right | 4.2 km || 
|-id=910 bgcolor=#d6d6d6
| 235910 ||  || — || March 3, 2005 || Junk Bond || Junk Bond Obs. || K-2 || align=right | 1.8 km || 
|-id=911 bgcolor=#E9E9E9
| 235911 ||  || — || March 3, 2005 || Catalina || CSS || — || align=right | 3.8 km || 
|-id=912 bgcolor=#d6d6d6
| 235912 ||  || — || March 4, 2005 || Catalina || CSS || — || align=right | 6.8 km || 
|-id=913 bgcolor=#E9E9E9
| 235913 ||  || — || March 1, 2005 || Kitt Peak || Spacewatch || NEM || align=right | 2.5 km || 
|-id=914 bgcolor=#d6d6d6
| 235914 ||  || — || March 3, 2005 || Kitt Peak || Spacewatch || — || align=right | 2.9 km || 
|-id=915 bgcolor=#d6d6d6
| 235915 ||  || — || March 3, 2005 || Kitt Peak || Spacewatch || EOS || align=right | 3.6 km || 
|-id=916 bgcolor=#d6d6d6
| 235916 ||  || — || March 3, 2005 || Catalina || CSS || HYG || align=right | 4.9 km || 
|-id=917 bgcolor=#E9E9E9
| 235917 ||  || — || March 3, 2005 || Catalina || CSS || — || align=right | 3.2 km || 
|-id=918 bgcolor=#d6d6d6
| 235918 ||  || — || March 3, 2005 || Catalina || CSS || 627 || align=right | 3.8 km || 
|-id=919 bgcolor=#d6d6d6
| 235919 ||  || — || March 3, 2005 || Catalina || CSS || EUP || align=right | 6.0 km || 
|-id=920 bgcolor=#d6d6d6
| 235920 ||  || — || March 4, 2005 || Kitt Peak || Spacewatch || — || align=right | 4.0 km || 
|-id=921 bgcolor=#d6d6d6
| 235921 ||  || — || March 4, 2005 || Kitt Peak || Spacewatch || — || align=right | 5.7 km || 
|-id=922 bgcolor=#d6d6d6
| 235922 ||  || — || March 4, 2005 || Mount Lemmon || Mount Lemmon Survey || URS || align=right | 6.5 km || 
|-id=923 bgcolor=#E9E9E9
| 235923 ||  || — || March 2, 2005 || Anderson Mesa || LONEOS || BRU || align=right | 2.9 km || 
|-id=924 bgcolor=#d6d6d6
| 235924 ||  || — || March 4, 2005 || Catalina || CSS || — || align=right | 5.0 km || 
|-id=925 bgcolor=#d6d6d6
| 235925 ||  || — || March 3, 2005 || Catalina || CSS || — || align=right | 3.5 km || 
|-id=926 bgcolor=#d6d6d6
| 235926 ||  || — || March 3, 2005 || Catalina || CSS || ALA || align=right | 6.3 km || 
|-id=927 bgcolor=#d6d6d6
| 235927 ||  || — || March 3, 2005 || Catalina || CSS || — || align=right | 3.8 km || 
|-id=928 bgcolor=#d6d6d6
| 235928 ||  || — || March 3, 2005 || Catalina || CSS || — || align=right | 3.0 km || 
|-id=929 bgcolor=#d6d6d6
| 235929 ||  || — || March 3, 2005 || Kitt Peak || Spacewatch || — || align=right | 6.2 km || 
|-id=930 bgcolor=#E9E9E9
| 235930 ||  || — || March 4, 2005 || Mount Lemmon || Mount Lemmon Survey || HOF || align=right | 3.4 km || 
|-id=931 bgcolor=#d6d6d6
| 235931 ||  || — || March 4, 2005 || Catalina || CSS || — || align=right | 4.8 km || 
|-id=932 bgcolor=#d6d6d6
| 235932 ||  || — || March 4, 2005 || Mount Lemmon || Mount Lemmon Survey || KOR || align=right | 2.1 km || 
|-id=933 bgcolor=#FA8072
| 235933 ||  || — || March 7, 2005 || Socorro || LINEAR || H || align=right | 1.2 km || 
|-id=934 bgcolor=#d6d6d6
| 235934 ||  || — || March 8, 2005 || Kitt Peak || Spacewatch || CHA || align=right | 2.9 km || 
|-id=935 bgcolor=#d6d6d6
| 235935 ||  || — || March 8, 2005 || Mount Lemmon || Mount Lemmon Survey || — || align=right | 3.9 km || 
|-id=936 bgcolor=#d6d6d6
| 235936 ||  || — || March 9, 2005 || Kitt Peak || Spacewatch || KOR || align=right | 1.6 km || 
|-id=937 bgcolor=#d6d6d6
| 235937 ||  || — || March 9, 2005 || Catalina || CSS || — || align=right | 6.6 km || 
|-id=938 bgcolor=#d6d6d6
| 235938 ||  || — || March 9, 2005 || Anderson Mesa || LONEOS || — || align=right | 4.4 km || 
|-id=939 bgcolor=#d6d6d6
| 235939 ||  || — || March 9, 2005 || Mount Lemmon || Mount Lemmon Survey || — || align=right | 3.0 km || 
|-id=940 bgcolor=#d6d6d6
| 235940 ||  || — || March 9, 2005 || Mount Lemmon || Mount Lemmon Survey || — || align=right | 4.2 km || 
|-id=941 bgcolor=#d6d6d6
| 235941 ||  || — || March 9, 2005 || Mount Lemmon || Mount Lemmon Survey || — || align=right | 3.4 km || 
|-id=942 bgcolor=#d6d6d6
| 235942 ||  || — || March 9, 2005 || Mount Lemmon || Mount Lemmon Survey || — || align=right | 3.5 km || 
|-id=943 bgcolor=#d6d6d6
| 235943 ||  || — || March 10, 2005 || Catalina || CSS || — || align=right | 2.6 km || 
|-id=944 bgcolor=#d6d6d6
| 235944 ||  || — || March 10, 2005 || Catalina || CSS || — || align=right | 4.7 km || 
|-id=945 bgcolor=#d6d6d6
| 235945 ||  || — || March 10, 2005 || Mount Lemmon || Mount Lemmon Survey || KOR || align=right | 2.0 km || 
|-id=946 bgcolor=#d6d6d6
| 235946 ||  || — || March 10, 2005 || Mount Lemmon || Mount Lemmon Survey || — || align=right | 2.9 km || 
|-id=947 bgcolor=#d6d6d6
| 235947 ||  || — || March 10, 2005 || Kitt Peak || Spacewatch || — || align=right | 3.6 km || 
|-id=948 bgcolor=#d6d6d6
| 235948 ||  || — || March 9, 2005 || Socorro || LINEAR || — || align=right | 4.1 km || 
|-id=949 bgcolor=#d6d6d6
| 235949 ||  || — || March 9, 2005 || Mount Lemmon || Mount Lemmon Survey || KOR || align=right | 1.6 km || 
|-id=950 bgcolor=#d6d6d6
| 235950 ||  || — || March 9, 2005 || Mount Lemmon || Mount Lemmon Survey || CHA || align=right | 2.6 km || 
|-id=951 bgcolor=#d6d6d6
| 235951 ||  || — || March 9, 2005 || Mount Lemmon || Mount Lemmon Survey || — || align=right | 3.5 km || 
|-id=952 bgcolor=#d6d6d6
| 235952 ||  || — || March 11, 2005 || Kitt Peak || Spacewatch || — || align=right | 5.2 km || 
|-id=953 bgcolor=#E9E9E9
| 235953 ||  || — || March 8, 2005 || Socorro || LINEAR || DOR || align=right | 2.6 km || 
|-id=954 bgcolor=#E9E9E9
| 235954 ||  || — || March 9, 2005 || Mount Lemmon || Mount Lemmon Survey || NEM || align=right | 2.4 km || 
|-id=955 bgcolor=#d6d6d6
| 235955 ||  || — || March 9, 2005 || Mount Lemmon || Mount Lemmon Survey || KOR || align=right | 1.5 km || 
|-id=956 bgcolor=#d6d6d6
| 235956 ||  || — || March 10, 2005 || Mount Lemmon || Mount Lemmon Survey || — || align=right | 3.0 km || 
|-id=957 bgcolor=#d6d6d6
| 235957 ||  || — || March 11, 2005 || Mount Lemmon || Mount Lemmon Survey || 628 || align=right | 1.9 km || 
|-id=958 bgcolor=#d6d6d6
| 235958 ||  || — || March 11, 2005 || Mount Lemmon || Mount Lemmon Survey || — || align=right | 3.1 km || 
|-id=959 bgcolor=#E9E9E9
| 235959 ||  || — || March 11, 2005 || Kitt Peak || Spacewatch || — || align=right | 2.9 km || 
|-id=960 bgcolor=#d6d6d6
| 235960 ||  || — || March 11, 2005 || Kitt Peak || Spacewatch || — || align=right | 3.1 km || 
|-id=961 bgcolor=#d6d6d6
| 235961 ||  || — || March 13, 2005 || Catalina || CSS || — || align=right | 3.9 km || 
|-id=962 bgcolor=#d6d6d6
| 235962 ||  || — || March 8, 2005 || Mount Lemmon || Mount Lemmon Survey || THM || align=right | 2.6 km || 
|-id=963 bgcolor=#fefefe
| 235963 ||  || — || March 8, 2005 || Socorro || LINEAR || H || align=right data-sort-value="0.88" | 880 m || 
|-id=964 bgcolor=#d6d6d6
| 235964 ||  || — || March 9, 2005 || Mount Lemmon || Mount Lemmon Survey || EOS || align=right | 2.5 km || 
|-id=965 bgcolor=#d6d6d6
| 235965 ||  || — || March 9, 2005 || Kitt Peak || Spacewatch || — || align=right | 3.7 km || 
|-id=966 bgcolor=#d6d6d6
| 235966 ||  || — || March 10, 2005 || Siding Spring || SSS || — || align=right | 4.1 km || 
|-id=967 bgcolor=#d6d6d6
| 235967 ||  || — || March 11, 2005 || Mount Lemmon || Mount Lemmon Survey || — || align=right | 4.1 km || 
|-id=968 bgcolor=#E9E9E9
| 235968 ||  || — || March 11, 2005 || Kitt Peak || Spacewatch || — || align=right | 1.9 km || 
|-id=969 bgcolor=#d6d6d6
| 235969 ||  || — || March 11, 2005 || Kitt Peak || Spacewatch || — || align=right | 3.0 km || 
|-id=970 bgcolor=#d6d6d6
| 235970 ||  || — || March 11, 2005 || Kitt Peak || Spacewatch || — || align=right | 3.9 km || 
|-id=971 bgcolor=#d6d6d6
| 235971 ||  || — || March 12, 2005 || Kitt Peak || Spacewatch || THM || align=right | 2.7 km || 
|-id=972 bgcolor=#d6d6d6
| 235972 ||  || — || March 14, 2005 || Mount Lemmon || Mount Lemmon Survey || THB || align=right | 4.4 km || 
|-id=973 bgcolor=#d6d6d6
| 235973 ||  || — || March 15, 2005 || Catalina || CSS || ALA || align=right | 5.8 km || 
|-id=974 bgcolor=#d6d6d6
| 235974 ||  || — || March 11, 2005 || Mount Lemmon || Mount Lemmon Survey || KOR || align=right | 1.8 km || 
|-id=975 bgcolor=#d6d6d6
| 235975 ||  || — || March 11, 2005 || Mount Lemmon || Mount Lemmon Survey || — || align=right | 3.8 km || 
|-id=976 bgcolor=#d6d6d6
| 235976 ||  || — || March 11, 2005 || Kitt Peak || Spacewatch || THM || align=right | 3.5 km || 
|-id=977 bgcolor=#d6d6d6
| 235977 ||  || — || March 12, 2005 || Kitt Peak || Spacewatch || — || align=right | 3.7 km || 
|-id=978 bgcolor=#d6d6d6
| 235978 ||  || — || March 13, 2005 || Kitt Peak || Spacewatch || — || align=right | 2.9 km || 
|-id=979 bgcolor=#d6d6d6
| 235979 ||  || — || March 15, 2005 || Mount Lemmon || Mount Lemmon Survey || EUP || align=right | 5.1 km || 
|-id=980 bgcolor=#d6d6d6
| 235980 ||  || — || March 10, 2005 || Anderson Mesa || LONEOS || CHA || align=right | 3.6 km || 
|-id=981 bgcolor=#d6d6d6
| 235981 ||  || — || March 10, 2005 || Mount Lemmon || Mount Lemmon Survey || — || align=right | 2.7 km || 
|-id=982 bgcolor=#d6d6d6
| 235982 ||  || — || March 10, 2005 || Catalina || CSS || — || align=right | 3.0 km || 
|-id=983 bgcolor=#d6d6d6
| 235983 ||  || — || March 4, 2005 || Mount Lemmon || Mount Lemmon Survey || — || align=right | 3.6 km || 
|-id=984 bgcolor=#d6d6d6
| 235984 ||  || — || March 11, 2005 || Kitt Peak || Spacewatch || — || align=right | 3.5 km || 
|-id=985 bgcolor=#d6d6d6
| 235985 ||  || — || March 12, 2005 || Kitt Peak || M. W. Buie || KOR || align=right | 1.7 km || 
|-id=986 bgcolor=#d6d6d6
| 235986 ||  || — || March 3, 2005 || Kitt Peak || Spacewatch || KOR || align=right | 2.1 km || 
|-id=987 bgcolor=#d6d6d6
| 235987 ||  || — || March 11, 2005 || Mount Lemmon || Mount Lemmon Survey || — || align=right | 3.6 km || 
|-id=988 bgcolor=#d6d6d6
| 235988 ||  || — || March 2, 2005 || Catalina || CSS || EOS || align=right | 3.0 km || 
|-id=989 bgcolor=#d6d6d6
| 235989 ||  || — || March 15, 2005 || Catalina || CSS || — || align=right | 2.9 km || 
|-id=990 bgcolor=#d6d6d6
| 235990 Laennec ||  ||  || March 16, 2005 || Saint-Sulpice || B. Christophe || — || align=right | 3.6 km || 
|-id=991 bgcolor=#d6d6d6
| 235991 ||  || — || March 31, 2005 || Anderson Mesa || LONEOS || — || align=right | 3.9 km || 
|-id=992 bgcolor=#d6d6d6
| 235992 ||  || — || March 17, 2005 || Kitt Peak || Spacewatch || KOR || align=right | 2.1 km || 
|-id=993 bgcolor=#d6d6d6
| 235993 ||  || — || March 16, 2005 || Catalina || CSS || EOS || align=right | 3.1 km || 
|-id=994 bgcolor=#d6d6d6
| 235994 ||  || — || April 1, 2005 || Catalina || CSS || EUP || align=right | 5.2 km || 
|-id=995 bgcolor=#d6d6d6
| 235995 ||  || — || April 1, 2005 || Kitt Peak || Spacewatch || EOS || align=right | 6.0 km || 
|-id=996 bgcolor=#d6d6d6
| 235996 ||  || — || April 2, 2005 || Bergisch Gladbac || W. Bickel || — || align=right | 4.0 km || 
|-id=997 bgcolor=#d6d6d6
| 235997 ||  || — || April 2, 2005 || Goodricke-Pigott || R. A. Tucker || — || align=right | 4.4 km || 
|-id=998 bgcolor=#d6d6d6
| 235998 ||  || — || April 4, 2005 || Catalina || CSS || — || align=right | 5.1 km || 
|-id=999 bgcolor=#d6d6d6
| 235999 Bucciantini ||  ||  || April 4, 2005 || San Marcello || L. Tesi, G. Fagioli || — || align=right | 4.2 km || 
|-id=000 bgcolor=#d6d6d6
| 236000 ||  || — || April 4, 2005 || Catalina || CSS || — || align=right | 3.3 km || 
|}

References

External links 
 Discovery Circumstances: Numbered Minor Planets (235001)–(240000) (IAU Minor Planet Center)

0235